= Enlargement of the European Union =

Accession of new countries to the EU

The territories of the member states of the European Union (European Communities pre-1993), animated in order of accession. Territories outside Europe and its immediate surroundings are not shown.

The European Union (EU) has expanded a number of times throughout its history by way of the accession of new member states to the Union. To join the EU, a state needs to fulfil economic and political conditions called the Copenhagen criteria (named after the Copenhagen summit in June 1993), which require a stable democratic government that respects the rule of law, and its corresponding freedoms and institutions. According to the Maastricht Treaty, each current member state and the European Parliament must agree to any enlargement. The process of enlargement is sometimes referred to as European integration. This term is also used to refer to the intensification of co-operation between EU member states as national governments allow for the gradual harmonisation of national laws.

The EU's predecessor, the European Economic Community, was founded with the Inner Six member states in 1958, when the Treaty of Rome came into force. Since then, the EU's membership has grown to twenty-seven, with the latest member state being Croatia, which joined in July 2013. The most recent territorial enlargement of the EU was the incorporation of Mayotte in 2014. Campione d'Italia joined the EU Customs Union in 2020. The most notable territorial reductions of the EU, and its predecessors, have been the exit of Algeria upon independence in 1962, the exit of Greenland in 1985, and the withdrawal of the United Kingdom in 2020.

Accession negotiations are currently ongoing with Montenegro (since 2012), Serbia (since 2014), Albania (since 2020), North Macedonia (since 2020), Moldova (since 2024), and Ukraine (since 2024). Negotiations with Turkey were opened in October 2005, but have been effectively frozen by the EU since December 2016, due to backsliding in the areas of democracy, rule of law, and fundamental rights.

Bosnia and Herzegovina and Georgia were granted official candidate status respectively in December 2022 and December 2023, but were asked to complete additional reforms before qualifying for the formal start of membership negotiations. Kosovo submitted an application for membership in December 2022. For Kosovo to be granted official candidate status, the Council will need to unanimously agree to start Kosovo's accession process by requesting an opinion from the European Commission on its application. The EU however remains divided on its policy towards Kosovo, with five EU member states not recognising its independence.

== Criteria ==
According to the EU treaties, membership of the European Union is open to "any European State which respects the values referred to in Article 2 and is committed to promoting them" (TEU Article 49). Those Article 2 values are "respect for human dignity, freedom, democracy, equality, the rule of law and respect for human rights, including the rights of persons belonging to minorities." This is based on the 1993 "Copenhagen criteria" agreed as it became clear many former Eastern Bloc countries would apply to join:

Membership requires that candidate country has achieved stability of institutions guaranteeing democracy, the rule of law, human rights, respect for and protection of minorities, the existence of a functioning market economy as well as the capacity to cope with competitive pressure and market forces within the Union. Membership presupposes the candidate's ability to take on the obligations of membership including adherence to the aims of political, economic and monetary union.

— Excerpt from the Copenhagen Presidency conclusions

In December 1995, the Madrid European Council revised the membership criteria to include conditions for member country integration through the appropriate adjustment of its administrative structures: since it is important that European Community legislation be reflected in national legislation, it is critical that the revised national legislation be implemented effectively through appropriate administrative and judicial structures.

Finally, and technically outside the Copenhagen criteria, comes the further requirement that all prospective members must enact legislation to bring their laws into line with the body of European law built up over the history of the Union, known as the acquis communautaire.

== Process ==
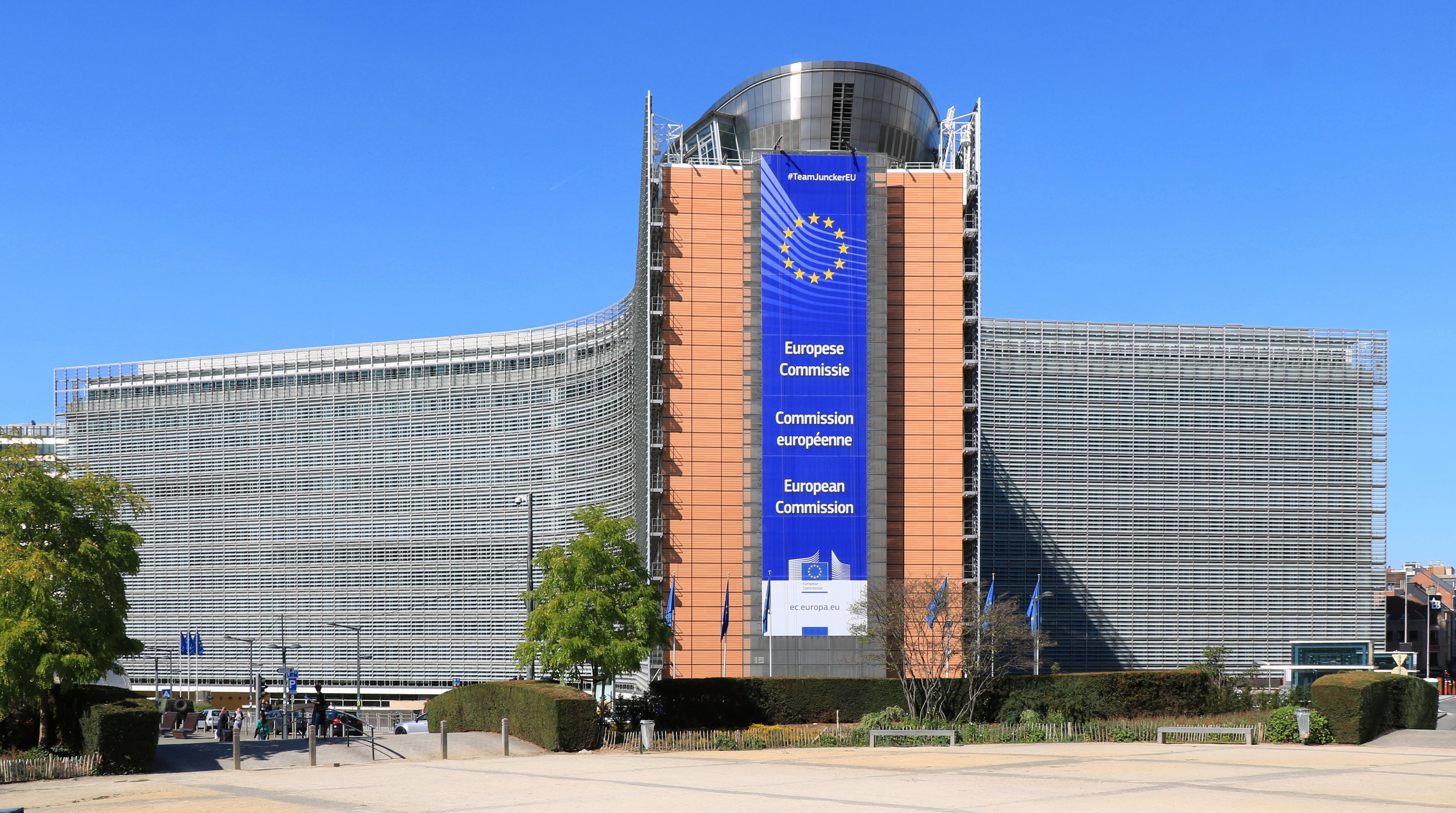
The European Commission, which plays a central role in the enlargement process.

Today the accession process follows a series of formal steps, from a pre-accession agreement to the ratification of the final accession treaty. These steps are primarily presided over by the European Commission (Enlargement Commissioner and DG Enlargement), but the actual negotiations are technically conducted between the Union's Member States and the candidate country.

Before a country applies for membership it typically signs an association agreement to help prepare the country for candidacy and eventual membership. Most countries do not meet the criteria to even begin negotiations before they apply, so they need many years to prepare for the process. An association agreement helps prepare for this first step.

In the case of the Western Balkans, a special process, the Stabilisation and Association Process exists to deal with the special circumstances there.

When a country formally applies for membership, the Council asks the commission to prepare an opinion on the country's readiness to begin negotiations. The council can then either accept or reject the commission's opinion (The council has only once rejected the commission's opinion when the latter advised against opening negotiations with Greece).

If the Council agrees to open negotiations the screening process then begins. The commission and candidate country examine its laws and those of the EU and determine what differences exist. The Council then recommends opening negotiations on "chapters" of law that it feels there is sufficient common ground to have constructive negotiations. Negotiations are typically a matter of the candidate country convincing the EU that its laws and administrative capacity are sufficient to execute European law, which can be implemented as seen fit by the member states. Often this will involve time-lines before the Acquis Communautaire (European regulations, directives and standards) has to be fully implemented.

2010 population and GDP per capita of individual EU member states compared with those of non-member states in Europe.

A chapter is said to be closed when both sides have agreed it has been implemented sufficiently, however it can still be re-opened if the Commission feels that the candidate has fallen out of compliance.

To assess progress achieved by countries in preparing for accession to the European Union, the European Commission submits regular reports (yearly) to the European Council. These serve as a basis for the council to make decisions on negotiations or their extension to other candidates.

Once the negotiations are complete, a Treaty of Accession will be signed, which must then be ratified by all of the member states of the Union, as well as the institutions of the Union, and the candidate country. Once this has been completed it will join the Union on the date specified in the treaty.

The entire process, from application for membership to membership has typically taken about a decade, although some countries, notably Sweden, Finland, and Austria have been faster, taking only a few years. The process from application for association agreement through accession has taken far longer, as much as several decades (Turkey, for example, first applied for association in the 1950s and has yet to conclude accession negotiations).

On 18 October 2019, France vetoed starting of negotiations with Albania and North Macedonia, citing problems with the current enlargement process. In November 2019, France proposed a seven-stage accession plan for membership. The reformed accession strategy proposes participation in different programs, such as Erasmus, Banking Union, Capital Markets Union, Customs Union, etc.

=== Example ===
The following is an example of the accession process—Estonia's path to membership from its restoration of independence from the Soviet Union in November 1991 with recognition from the EU the same month to membership in May 2004. Ease of accession depends on the state: how integrated it is with the EU beforehand, the state of its economy and public institutions, any outstanding political issues with the EU and (historically) how much law to date the EU has built up that the acceding state must adopt. This outline also includes integration steps taken by the accession country after it attains membership.

Estonia EU membership timeline
| Year | Date | Event | Notes |
|---|---|---|---|
| 1991 | 20 August | Restoration of independence from USSR | Recognition from EU in same month. |
| 1994 | 18 July | Free trade agreement concluded | |
| 1995 | 1 January | Free trade agreement in force | |
| 1995 | 12 June | Europe Agreement concluded | |
| 1995 | 24 November | Applied for Membership | |
| 1998 | 1 January | Europe Agreement comes into force | Aiding pre-integration |
| 1998 | March | Membership negotiations open | 6 chapters opened |
| 1999 | | 17 chapters opened | |
| 2000 | | 6 chapters opened | |
| 2002 | December | All chapters closed and negotiations concluded | Final chapter (No. 30) was opened and closed at the same time. |
| 2003 | 8 April | Draft accession treaty approved by Estonian government | |
| 2003 | 16 April | Treaty of Accession signed | |
| 2003 | 14 September | Referendum on membership approved | 66.84% in favour, turnout : 64.02% |
| 2004 | 1 May | Acceded to EU | |
| 2004 | 28 June | Joined ERM | Requires 2 years in ERM before euro adoption |
| 2007 | 21 December | Entered the Schengen area | |
| 2011 | 1 January | Adoption of the euro | |
| 2011 | 1 May | Right to limit migration from 2004 countries expired | Only Austria and Germany applied this, the rest of EU countries abolished restrictions before 2011 |

== Success and fatigue ==
Enlargement has been one of the EU's successful foreign policies, yet has equally suffered from considerable opposition from the start. French President Charles de Gaulle opposed British membership. A later French President, François Mitterrand, opposed Greek, Spanish and Portuguese membership, fearing that the former dictatorships were not ready and that the countries' inclusion would reduce the union to a free-trade area.

The reasons for the first member states to apply, and for them to be accepted, were primarily economic while the second enlargement was more political. The southern Mediterranean countries had just emerged from dictatorships and wanted to secure their democratic systems through the EEC, while the EEC wanted to ensure the same thing and that their southern neighbours were stable and aligned to NATO. These two principal forces, economic gain and political security, have been behind enlargements since. After the large enlargements in 2004, public opinion in Europe turned against further expansion.

It has also been acknowledged that enlargement has its limits; the EU cannot expand endlessly. Former Commission President Romano Prodi favoured granting "everything but institutions" to the EU's neighbour states, allowing them to co-operate deeply while not adding strain on the EU's institutional framework. This has in particular been pushed by France and Germany as a privileged partnership for Turkey, membership for which has faced considerable opposition on cultural and logistical grounds.

== Historical enlargements ==
Applications for accession to the EU, ECSC or EC
| Applicant | Submitted | Accession / failure rationale |
|---|---|---|
| Albania | 28 April 2009 | Negotiating |
| Austria | 17 July 1989 | 1 January 1995 |
| Belgium | Founder | 23 July 1952 |
| Bosnia and Herzegovina | 15 February 2016 | Candidate |
| Bulgaria | 14 December 1995 | 1 January 2007 |
| Croatia | 21 February 2003 | 1 July 2013 |
| Cyprus | 3 July 1990 | 1 May 2004 |
| Czech Republic | 17 January 1996 | 1 May 2004 |
| Denmark | 10 August 1961 | (Note: Due to veto of UK application)Withdrawn |
| Denmark | 11 May 1967 | 1 January 1973 |
| Estonia | 24 November 1995 | 1 May 2004 |
| Finland | 18 March 1992 | 1 January 1995 |
| France | Founder | 23 July 1952 |
| (Georgia (country)) Georgia | 3 March 2022 | Candidate |
| West Germany (Note: On 3 October 1990, East Germany joined West Germany through the process of German reunification; since then, the reunited Germany has been a single member state.) | Founder | 23 July 1952 |
| Greece | 12 June 1975 | 1 January 1981 |
| Hungary | 31 March 1994 | 1 May 2004 |
| Iceland | 17 July 2009 | (Note: Following the 2013 parliamentary election)Frozen |
| (Republic of Ireland) Ireland | 31 July 1961 | Withdrawn |
| (Republic of Ireland) Ireland | 11 May 1967 | 1 January 1973 |
| Italy | Founder | 23 July 1952 |
| Kosovo | 14 December 2022 | Applicant |
| Latvia | 13 September 1995 | 1 May 2004 |
| Lithuania | 8 December 1995 | 1 May 2004 |
| Luxembourg | Founder | 23 July 1952 |
| Malta | 16 July 1990 | (Note: Frozen following the 1996 general election. Resumed following the 1998 general election.)Frozen |
| Malta | 16 July 1990 | 1 May 2004 |
| Moldova | 3 March 2022 | Negotiating |
| Montenegro | 15 December 2008 | Negotiating |
| Morocco | 20 July 1987 | (Note: By the European Council)Rejected |
| Netherlands | Founder | 23 July 1952 |
| North Macedonia (Note: Referred to as "the former Yugoslav Republic of Macedonia" by the EU before 2019.) | 22 March 2004 | Negotiating |
| Norway | 30 April 1962 | Withdrawn |
| Norway | 21 July 1967 | (Note: Following the 1972 referendum)Withdrawn |
| Norway | 25 November 1992 | (Note: Following the 1994 referendum)Withdrawn |
| Poland | 5 April 1994 | 1 May 2004 |
| Portugal | 28 March 1977 | 1 January 1986 |
| Romania | 22 June 1995 | 1 January 2007 |
| Serbia | 22 December 2009 | Negotiating |
| Slovakia | 27 June 1995 | 1 May 2004 |
| Slovenia | 10 June 1996 | 1 May 2004 |
| Spain | 9 February 1962 | Rejected |
| Spain | 28 June 1977 | 1 January 1986 |
| Sweden | 1 July 1991 | 1 January 1995 |
| Switzerland | 25 May 1992 | (Note: Due to public opinion)Withdrawn |
| Turkey | 14 April 1987 | Frozen negotiations |
| Ukraine | 28 February 2022 | Negotiating |
| United Kingdom | 10 August 1961 | (Note: By France)Vetoed |
| United Kingdom | 10 May 1967 | 1 January 1973 |

=== Membership of EU predecessors ===
The European Coal and Steel Community (ECSC) was proposed by Robert Schuman in his declaration on 9 May 1950 and involved the pooling of the coal and steel industries of France and West Germany. Half of the project states, Belgium, Luxembourg, and the Netherlands, had already achieved a great degree of integration amongst themselves with the organs of Benelux and earlier bilateral agreements. These five countries were joined by Italy and they all signed the Treaty of Paris on 23 July 1952. These six members, dubbed the 'Inner Six' (as opposed to the 'outer seven' who formed the European Free Trade Association who were suspicious of such plans for integration) went on to sign the Treaties of Rome establishing two further communities, together known as the European Communities when they merged their executives in 1967.

In 1962, Spain, ruled by the military dictator Francisco Franco, issued its first attempt to join the European Communities. Spanish Foreign Affairs minister Fernando María Castiella sent the request form to French Prime Minister Maurice Couve de Murville. This request was rejected by all the member countries in 1964; Spain was not a democracy at the time, and thus unable to enter the EEC.

The Community did see some loss of territory due to the decolonialisation occurring in their era. Algeria, which was an integral part of France, had a special relationship with the Community. Algeria gained independence on 5 July 1962 and hence left the Community. There would be no further efforts at enlargement until the early 1970s.

=== Enlargement of the European Communities ===
Interactive map of the enlargement and evolution of the European Union, excluding Greenland and Algeria

The United Kingdom, which had refused to join as a founding member, changed its policy following the Suez Crisis and applied to be a member of the Communities. Other EEC members were also inclined to British membership on those grounds. French President Charles de Gaulle vetoed British membership.

Once de Gaulle had left office, the door to enlargement was once again opened. The EEC economy had also slowed down and British membership was seen as a way to revitalise the community. Only after a 12-hour talk between British Prime Minister Edward Heath and French President Georges Pompidou took place did Britain's third application succeed. After Britain was accepted Prime Minister Edward Heath said:

For my part, I have no doubt at all that the discussions which we have had will prove of real and lasting benefit, not only to Britain and France, but to Europe as a whole.

As part of the deal for British entry, France agreed to allow the EEC its own monetary resources. However France made that concession only as Britain's small agriculture sector would ensure that Britain would be a net contributor to the Common Agricultural Policy dominated EEC budget. Applying together with the UK, as on the previous occasions, were Denmark, Ireland, and Norway. These countries were so economically linked to the UK that they considered it necessary to join the EEC if the UK did. However the Norwegian government lost a national referendum on membership and hence did not accede with the others on 1 January 1973. Gibraltar joined the Community with the United Kingdom at this point, as can be seen in the long title of the UK European Communities Act 1972.

=== Mediterranean enlargements ===
The next enlargement would occur for different reasons. The 1970s also saw Greece, Spain, and Portugal emerge from dictatorship. These countries desired to consolidate their new democratic systems by binding themselves into the EEC. Equally, the EEC was unsure about which way these countries were heading and wanted to ensure stability along its southern borders. However François Mitterrand initially opposed their membership fearing they were not ready and it would water the community down to a free trade area.

Greece joined the EEC in 1981 followed by Spain and Portugal in 1986. None of these nations had a referendum related to accession.

The year 1985, however, saw the first time a territory voted to leave the Community, when Greenland was granted home rule by Denmark and the territory used its new powers and voted to withdraw from the Community (see member state territories).

Morocco and Turkey applied for membership in 1987. Morocco's application was turned down as it was not considered European; Turkey's application was considered eligible on the basis of the 1963 Ankara Association Agreement but the opinion of the Commission on the possible candidate status was by then negative. Turkey received candidate status in 1999 and began full membership negotiations in 2005, which were still in progress as of 2021.

=== Post–Cold War ===
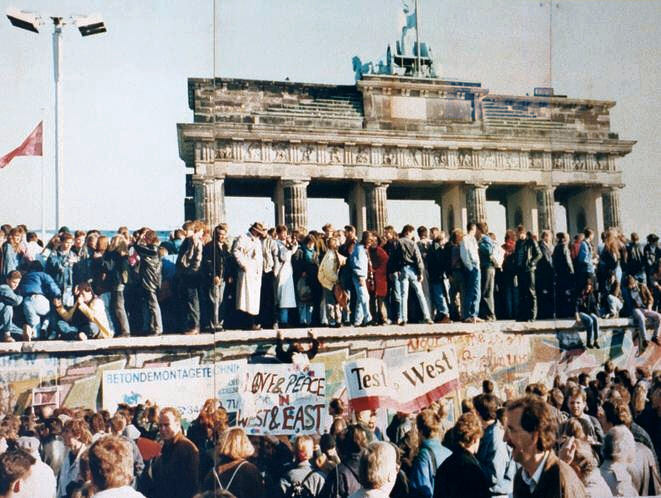
The Iron Curtain's fall enabled eastward enlargement. (Berlin Wall)

After the 1970s, Europe experienced an economic downturn which led to leaders launching of the Single European Act which set to create a single market by 1992. The effect of this was that EFTA states found it harder to export to the EEC and businesses (including large EFTA corporations such as Volvo) wished to relocate within the new single market making the downturn worse for EFTA. EFTA states began to discuss closer links with the EEC despite its domestic unpopularity.

Austria, Finland, and Sweden were neutral in the Cold War so membership of an organisation developing a common foreign and security policy would be incompatible with that. With the end of the Cold War in 1989, that obstacle was removed, and the desire to pursue membership grew stronger. On 3 October 1990, the reunification of East and West Germany brought East Germany into the Community without increasing the number of member states.

The Community later became the European Union in 1993 by virtue of the Maastricht Treaty, and established standards for new entrants so their suitability could be judged. The Copenhagen criteria stated in 1993 that a country must be a democracy, operate a free market, and be willing to adopt the entire body of EU law already agreed upon. Also in 1993 the European Economic Area was established with the EFTA states except Switzerland. Most of the new EEA states pursued full EU membership as the EEA did not sufficiently satisfy the needs of their export based corporations. The EU has also preferred these states to integrate via the EEA rather than full membership as the EEC wished to pursue monetary integration and did not wish for another round of enlargement to occupy their attention. However, with the EEA's credibility dented following rejection by businesses and Switzerland, the EU agreed with full membership. This was more readily accepted with the prospect of poorer countries wishing to join; contributions from richer countries would help balance the EU budget. On 1 January 1995 Austria, Finland, and Sweden acceded to the EU marking its fourth enlargement. The Norwegian government lost a second national referendum on membership.

=== Central and Eastern enlargement ===
EU enlargements, 2004–2013: EU from 1 January 1995 to 30 April 2004 Joined the EU on 1 May 2004 Joined the EU on 1 January 2007 Joined the EU on 1 July 2013

In the late 1980s (shortly prior to the dissolution of the Soviet Union) Mikhail Gorbachev announced the Soviet Union would no longer intervene in other countries' internal affairs (Sinatra Doctrine), practically freeing Central and Eastern Europe from Soviet occupation (Czechoslovakia and Hungary) / Soviet-backed authoritarian regimes. These countries wanted to consolidate their democracies through joining Western world international organisations (including participation in European integration) which would ensure the newly emerged democracies would not fall back under Russian control. The EU and NATO offered a guarantee of this, and the EU was also seen as vital to ensuring the economic success of those countries. However, the EU's desire to accept these countries' membership applications was less than rapid. The collapse of communism came quickly and was not anticipated. The EU struggled to deal with the sudden reunification of Germany with the addition of its poorer 17 million people and, while keeping its monetary union project on track, it was still at that early stage pointing the EFTA countries in the direction of the EEA rather than full membership.

States in Central and Eastern Europe persisted and eventually the above-mentioned issues were cleared. The US also pressured the EU to offer membership as a temporary guarantee; it feared expanding NATO too rapidly for fear of frightening Russia. Although eventually trying to limit the number of members, and after encouragement from the US, the EU pursued talks with ten countries and a change of mind by Cyprus and Malta helped to offset slightly the influx of large poorer member states from Central and Eastern Europe.

The 10 post-Communist European Union candidate countries in 1998
| Country | Europe Association Agreement signing date | Start of accession negotiations | Population (1998) | 1998 GDP ($ billions) (Note: 1998 GDP per capita multiplied by 1998 population) | 1998 GDP (PPP) per capita | Real GDP (1998; 1989=100) (Note: the average between the EIU estimate (used by the OECD) and the UNECE estimate (used by the Council of Europe)) | Real wage (1998; 1989=100) | Real gross industrial output (1998; 1989=100) | Private sector share of GDP (1998) | Asset share of state-owned banks (1998) | External debt (1998; % of GDP) | General government debt (1998; % of GDP) | Net inflows of FDI (1998; % of GDP) | General government balance (1998; % of GDP) | FH Nations in Transit score (1998) (Note: The Nations in Transit score comprises 8 categories: political process, civil society, independent media, governance and public administration, rule of law, privatization, macroeconomics and microeconomics. Each category is assigned a score from 1 (highest) to 7 (lowest). Thus, the greater the final score (8 to 56), the more authoritarian the country. In 1998, the most authoritarian of the 10 EU candidates was Romania: with a score of 33, Romania was even more authoritarian than Russia (32).) |
|---|---|---|---|---|---|---|---|---|---|---|---|---|---|---|---|
| Bulgaria | 1993-03-03 | 2000-02-15 | 8.34 | 12.7 | $4,776 €4,583 | 67.3 | 47.0 | 44.3 | 65% | 59.5% | 80.6 | 95.6 | 4 | 2 | 30 |
| Czech Republic | 1993-10-04 | 1998-03-31 | 10.28 | 60.8 | $12,479 €12,045 | 95.45 | 101.0 | 79.4 | 75% | 18.8% | 40.0 | 13.2 | 6 | −4 | 14 |
| Estonia | 1995-06-13 | 1998-03-31 | 1.43 | 5.65 | $7,607 €7,491 | 79.95 | 74.3 | 59.0 | 70% | 7.8% | 52.5 | 6.0 | 11 | 0 | 16 |
| Hungary | 1991-12-16 | 1998-03-31 | 10.12 | 46.9 | $10,202 €9,735 | 95.3 | 79.6 | 103.0 | 80% | 11.8% | 58.0 | 61.9 | 4 | −8 | 13 |
| Latvia | 1995-06-13 | 2000-02-15 | 2.42 | 6.6 | $5,557 €5,465 | 59.4 | 63.0 | 47.9 | 65% | 8.5% | 46.8 | 10.6 | 6 | −1 | 18 |
| Lithuania | 1995-06-13 | 2000-02-15 | 3.69 | 11 | $6,437 €6,124 | 65.6 | 44.6 | 40.6 | 70% | 45.3% | 34.2 | 16.5 | 8 | −3 | 18 |
| Poland | 1991-12-16 | 1998-03-31 | 38.72 | 158.5 | $7,658 €7,756 | 117.2 | 85.2 | 117.3 | 65% | 48% | 37.3 | 39.9 | 4 | −4 | 13 |
| Romania | 1993-02-01 | 2000-02-15 | 22.47 | 42.1 | $5,646 €5,576 | 78.1 | 61.1 | 42.5 | 60% | 74.6% | 23.6 | 27.6 | 5 | −4 | 33 |
| Slovakia | 1993-10-04 | 2000-02-15 | 5.38 | 22.2 | $9,817 €9,615 | 99.8 | 88.8 | 80.9 | 75% | 50% | 53.7 | 28.6 | 3 | −5 | 29 |
| Slovenia | 1996-06-10 | 1998-03-31 | 1.99 | 21.1 | $14,305 €13,589 | 102.25 | 86.7 | 75.9 | 60% | 41.3% | 34.7 | 22.2 | 1 | −2 | 16 |

Notes:

In the end, eight Central and Eastern European countries (the Czech Republic, Estonia, Hungary, Latvia, Lithuania, Poland, Slovakia, and Slovenia), plus two Mediterranean countries (Malta and Cyprus), joined on 1 May 2004. This was the largest single enlargement in terms of people, and number of countries, though not in terms of GDP. The less developed nature of these countries was of concern to some of the older member states. Some countries, such as the UK, immediately opened their job market to the accession states, whereas most others placed temporary restrictions on the rights of work of the citizens of these states to their countries. The movement westward of some of the labour force of the newly acceded countries that occurred in the aftermath of the enlargement initially spawned clichés among the public opinion and media of some western countries (such as the "Polish plumber"), despite the generally conceded benefit to the economies concerned. The official EU media (the speeches of the European Commission) frequently referred to the enlargement to the CEE region as "an historical opportunity" and "morally imperative", which reflected the desire of the EU to admit these countries as members, even though they were less developed than the Western European countries.

Following this, Romania and Bulgaria, deemed as not fully ready by the commission to join in 2004, acceded instead on 1 January 2007. These, like the countries joining in 2004, faced a series of restrictions as to their citizens not fully enjoying working rights on the territory of some of the older EU members until 2014. Romania and Bulgaria did not have a referendum related to accession.

=== Western Balkans enlargements ===
The 2003 European Council summit in Thessaloniki set integration of the Western Balkans as a priority of EU expansion. The EU's relations with the Western Balkans states were moved from the "External Relations" to the "Enlargement" policy segment in 2005. Those states which have not been recognised as candidate countries are considered "potential candidate countries". The move to Enlargement directorate was a consequence of the advancement of the Stabilisation and Association process.

Croatia joined on 1 July 2013, following ratification of the 2011 Accession Treaty by all other EU countries. Albania and the several successor states of the Socialist Federal Republic of Yugoslavia have all adopted EU integration as an aim of foreign policy.

=== Detail ===
| # | Official name | Date | Community countries and OMR | Associated territories | Excluded territories |
|---|---|---|---|---|---|
| 1 | ECSC foundation | 23 July 1952 | Belgium, Netherlands, Luxembourg, France, Saarland, Italy, West Germany, West Berlin (Note: Until the reunification of Germany in 1990 the de jure status of West Berlin was that of French, UK and US occupied zones with West German civilian administration. The treaties applied fully during 1952–1990 over the West German and French responsibilities, and during 1973–1990 over the UK responsibilities. From 3 October 1990 West Berlin was fully integrated in the Federal Republic of Germany along with East Germany.) | | Belgian Congo, Ruanda-Urundi, Cambodia, Laos, Vietnam, French Tunisia, French Morocco, Adélie Land, Comoro Islands, Chad, Gabon, Middle Congo, Ubangi-Shari, French India, French Oceania, (Note: Renamed French Polynesia on 1957-07-22) Clipperton Island, French Somaliland, Dahomey, French Guinea, French Sudan, Ivory Coast, Mauritania, Niger, Senegal, Upper Volta, French Cameroons, French Togoland, Madagascar, Crozet Islands, Kerguelen Islands, Saint-Paul-and-Amsterdam Islands, New Caledonia, Wallis-et-Futuna, French Guiana, Guadeloupe, Martinique, Réunion, French Algeria, Saint Pierre and Miquelon, Scattered Islands in the Indian Ocean, French-administration of the New Hebrides, (Note: The New Hebrides was a condominium between the United Kingdom and France until its independence in 1980, and was generally considered to be an overseas territory of both countries) Italian Somaliland, Netherlands New Guinea, Surinam, Netherlands Antilles |
| | | 1953–1957 | the above, Saarland joined West Germany | | the above without the newly independent: Cambodia, Laos, Vietnam, French Tunisia, French Morocco, French India; (Note: Became part of India on 1954-07-21) and without Adélie Land, Crozet Islands, Kerguelen Islands, Saint-Paul-and-Amsterdam Islands (Note: Adélie Land, Crozet Islands, Kerguelen Islands and Saint-Paul-and-Amsterdam Islands merged to become the French Southern and Antarctic Lands on 1955-08-06. All territories were already outside the ECSC and the merged territory retained the same status) |
| 2 | EEC and EURATOM foundation | 1 January 1958 | the above, French Algeria, Réunion, French Guiana, Martinique, Guadeloupe | French Guinea, French Cameroons, French Togoland, (Note: Renamed Togo on 1958-02-22) French Sudan, (Note: Renamed Sudanese Republic on 1958-11-24) (Note: Senegal and the Sudanese Republic merged on 1959-04-04 to create the Mali Federation) Senegal, Madagascar, (Note: Renamed Malagasy Republic on 1958-10-14) Belgian Congo, Italian Somaliland, Dahomey, Niger, Upper Volta, Ivory Coast, Chad, Ubangi-Shari, Middle Congo, (Note: Renamed Congo on 1958-11-28) Gabon, Mauritania, Ruanda-Urundi, Netherlands New Guinea, Comoro Islands, French Somaliland, (Note: Renamed French Territory of the Afars and the Issas in 1967) French-administration of the New Hebrides, St. Pierre and Miquelon, Wallis and Futuna, French Polynesia, New Caledonia, French Southern and Antarctic Lands, Scattered islands in the Indian Ocean | the above, West Berlin, without Scattered islands in the Indian Ocean |
| | | 1958–1962 | the above | the above, without the newly independent: French Guinea, French Cameroons, Togo, Mali Federation, Malagasy Republic, Belgian Congo, Italian Somaliland, Dahomey, Niger, Upper Volta, Ivory Coast, Chad, Central African Republic, Congo, Gabon, Mauritania, Ruanda-Urundi, (Note: Became independent as the Kingdom of Ruanda and the Kingdom of Burundi) Netherlands New Guinea (Note: Annexed by Indonesia in 1962) | the above |
| | | 3 July 1962 | the above, without the newly independent: Algeria | the above | the above |
| | | 1 September 1962 | the above | the above, with Surinam | the above, without Surinam |
| | Netherlands Antilles Association Convention | 1 October 1964 | the above | the above, with the Netherlands Antilles | the above, without the Netherlands Antilles |
| 3 | First enlargement | 1 January 1973 | the above, Republic of Ireland, United Kingdom, Gibraltar, Denmark (Note: Including the County of Greenland, which later gained home rule and left the EC) | the above, Antigua, Redonda, Dominica, Grenada, St. Christopher-Nevis-Anguilla, St. Lucia, St. Vincent, Brunei, Canton and Enderbury Islands, (Note: The UK co-administered the condominium of the Canton and Enderbury Islands with the US, until the UK merged it with its Gilbert and Ellice Islands colony on 1975-01-01 to create its Gilbert Islands colony. As such it ceased to be a condominium, but the US continued to claim it until 1979) Bahama Islands, Bermuda, British Antarctic Territory, British Honduras, (Note: Renamed Belize on 1973-06-01) British Indian Ocean Territory, British Virgin Islands, British Western Pacific Territories, (Note: Renamed the British Solomon Islands on 1976-01-02) Cayman Islands, Falkland Islands, Falkland Islands Dependencies, (Note: Renamed South Georgia and the South Sandwich Islands in 1985) Gilbert and Ellice Islands, (Note: Split into the Gilbert Islands (which was merged with the Canton and Enderbury Islands) and Ellice Island on 1975-01-01) Montserrat, Pitcairn Islands, St. Helena, Ascension Island, Tristan da Cunha, Seychelles, New Hebrides, Turks and Caicos Islands | the above, the Faroe Islands, Akrotiri and Dhekelia, (Note: British Sovereign Base Areas on the island of Cyprus) the Isle of Man, Jersey, Guernsey, Alderney, Sark, Rhodesia, (Note: Legally a British colony until independence in 1980) Hong Kong |
| | | 1973–1980 | the above | the above, Barbuda, (Note: The island of Barbuda became a separate territory from Antigua on 1976-12-23) Mayotte, (Note: The island of Mayotte became a separate territory in 1974, and chose to remain with France, rather than become independent) without the newly independent Bahama Islands, Grenada, St. Vincent, Seychelles, British Solomon Islands, Surinam, Ellice Island, Dominica, St. Lucia, Gilbert Islands, New Hebrides, Comoro Islands and French Territory of the Afars and the Issas | the above without the newly independent Rhodesia |
| 4 | Second enlargement | 1 January 1981 | the above, Greece | the above | the above |
| | | 1981–1984 | the above | the above, Anguilla, (Note: Anguilla stayed a British colony, while Saint Christopher and Nevis became independent as St. Kitts and Nevis) without the newly independent Belize, Antigua, Barbuda, Redonda, (Note: Antigua, Barbuda and Redonda merged to become independent as Antigua and Barbuda) St. Christopher and Nevis and Brunei | the above |
| | | 1 January 1985 | the above without Greenland | the above, Greenland | the above |
| 5 | Third enlargement | 1 January 1986 | the above, Spain, Portugal, Azores, Madeira, Plazas de soberanía, Canary Islands | the above, with Aruba, formerly part of the Netherlands Antilles (Note: Although Aruba was only added to the OCT list with the entry into force of the Treaty of Amsterdam in 1999, it was considered an OCT by the European Communities since leaving the Netherlands Antilles: "De eilandgebieden zullen dus de rechten en plichten van de LGO-status van het Land de Nederlandse Antillen overnemen, wanneer dat opgeheven wordt. Hetzelfde gebeurde in 1986 toen Aruba van eilandgebied van de Nederlandse Antillen een apart Land binnen het Koninkrijk werd. Hoewel de LGO-bijlage pas in 1999 aan deze situatie werd aangepast, heeft de Europese Gemeenschap Aruba van het begin af aan als LGO behandeld." in: Dutch Ministry of Foreign Affairs) (Note: The Netherlands Antilles dissolved on 10 October 2010 and contained the islands of Aruba (which left the Netherlands Antilles in 1986), Bonaire, Curacao, Sint Maarten, Saba and Sint Eustatius. Aruba, Curacao and Sint Maarten are autonomous countries in the Kingdom of Netherlands, and remain overseas territories of the European Union. Bonaire, St Eustatius and Saba, also known as the BES islands, are special municipalities of the Netherlands, and remained legally overseas territories) | the above, Macau, East Timor (Note: De jure a Portuguese colony under Indonesian occupation until 1999) |
| | German reunification | 3 October 1990 | the above, East Germany and West Berlin join to form Germany | the above | the above without West Berlin |
| 6 | Fourth enlargement | 1 January 1995 | the above, Austria, Sweden, Finland | the above | the above |
| | | 1 July 1997 | the above | the above | the above, without Hong Kong (Note: Transferred to China) |
| | | 20 December 1999 | the above | the above | the above, without Macau |
| | | 20 May 2002 | the above | the above | the above, without the newly independent East Timor |
| 7 | Fifth enlargement | 1 May 2004 | the above, Malta, Cyprus, Estonia, Latvia, Lithuania, Poland, Czech Republic, Slovakia, Slovenia, Hungary | the above, Akrotiri and Dhekelia | the above, without Akrotiri and Dhekelia |
| 8 | Sixth enlargement | 1 January 2007 | the above, Bulgaria, Romania | the above | the above |
| | | 22 February 2007 | the above, Collectivity of Saint Martin, Saint Barthélemy (Note: Saint Martin and Saint Barthélemy were part of Guadeloupe and thus already part of the EU. On 2007-02-22, they became separate territories but France retained application of EU law there, and their EU OMR status was confirmed in the Treaty of Lisbon, which entered into force on 2009-01-01.) | the above, without Scattered islands in the Indian Ocean (Note: The Scattered islands in the Indian Ocean became part of the French Southern and Antarctic Lands on 2007-02-22. Both territories were already EU OCTs and the merged territory retained the same status.) | the above |
| | | 10 October 2010 | the above | the above, without the now-dissolved Netherlands Antilles, with Curaçao, Sint Maarten, Bonaire, Sint Eustatius, Saba | the above |
| | | 1 January 2012 | the above, without Saint Barthélemy | the above, Saint Barthélemy | the above |
| 9 | Seventh enlargement | 1 July 2013 | the above, Croatia | the above | the above |
| 10 | | 1 January 2014 | the above, Mayotte | the above, without Mayotte | the above |
| 11 | Withdrawal of the United Kingdom | Transition period: 1 February 2020 to 31 December 2020 | the above, without United Kingdom, Gibraltar | the above without Akrotiri and Dhekelia, Anguilla, Bermuda, British Antarctic Territory, British Indian Ocean Territory, British Virgin Islands, Cayman Islands, Falkland Islands, Montserrat, Pitcairn, Saint Helena, Ascension and Tristan da Cunha, South Georgia and the South Sandwich Islands, and Turks and Caicos Islands | the above without the Isle of Man, Jersey, Guernsey |

== Potential enlargements ==
=== Current enlargement agenda ===
Current members (27) Candidates negotiating (6) Candidates (2) Applicant / Potential candidate (1) Candidate with frozen negotiations (1)

Article 49 of the Maastricht Treaty (as amended) says that any European state that respects the "principles of liberty, democracy, respect for human rights and fundamental freedoms, and the rule of law", may apply to join the Union. The European Council set out the conditions for EU membership in June 1993 in the so-called Copenhagen criteria (see Criteria above for details). The Western Balkan states had to sign Stabilisation and Association Agreements (SAAs) before applying for membership, but have been prioritised with an open path to apply for membership and roadmap for an accession perspective, since emerging from the break-up of Yugoslavia in the early 1990s and subsequent Yugoslav Wars.

Accession negotiations are currently ongoing with Montenegro (since 2012), Serbia (since 2014), Albania (since 2020), North Macedonia (since 2020), Moldova (since 2024) and Ukraine (since 2024). Negotiations with Turkey were opened in October 2005, but have been effectively frozen by the EU since December 2016, due to backsliding in the areas of democracy, rule of law, and fundamental rights.

The most advanced stage of the negotiations, defined as meeting the interim benchmarks for negotiation chapter 23 and 24 which allow the closing process of all negotiation chapters to start, has so far been reached by Montenegro (in 2024) and by Albania (in 2026). Montenegro's declared political goal is to achieve membership of the EU by 2028.

Bosnia and Herzegovina and Georgia were granted official candidate status respectively in December 2022 and December 2023, but were asked to complete additional reforms before qualifying for the formal start of membership negotiations. Kosovo submitted an application for membership in December 2022. For Kosovo to be granted official candidate status, the Council will need to unanimously agree to start Kosovo's accession process by requesting an opinion from the European Commission on its application. The EU however remains divided on its policy towards Kosovo, with five EU member states not recognising its independence.

==== EU enlargement policy ====
On 6 February 2018, the European Commission published its expansion plan, which covers the six Western Balkan countries. The plan envisages that all six applicants could achieve accession as members of the European Union after 2025. In May 2018, Bulgaria—holding the rotating presidency of the Council of the European Union—hosted a summit on the Western Balkans, which aimed to facilitate accession by the six, including enhanced regional security cooperation and regional connectivity.

It was noteworthy that the Summit referred to "partners" rather than states: this reflects that Kosovo is only partially recognised as a state. As of 2018, Kosovo was not recognised by fellow Western Balkan applicant Serbia and existing EU members Spain, Slovakia, Cyprus, Romania, and Greece. The European Commission is sensitive to the issue, which was addressed in a speech by the EU's High Representative/Vice-President Federica Mogherini at the European Parliament Plenary Session on the Western Balkan Strategy: "shared, unequivocal, concrete perspective for European Union integration for each and every one of the six partners. Each at its own pace, with its own specificities and under different conditions, but the direction is clear and is one."

Amid the 2022 Russian invasion of Ukraine, the three former Soviet republics of Ukraine, Moldova and Georgia submitted applications for EU membership. The European Parliament subsequently voted to accept an emergency petition from the government of Ukraine for EU member state candidacy. On 17 June 2022, the European Commission recommended that Ukraine and Moldova become candidates for EU membership and that Georgia be recognised as a potential candidate but that it would need to "meet certain conditions" to be granted candidate status. These conditions included investing more in education and infrastructure and completing several reforms in elections, judicial independence, crime, corruption, and oligarchs. These recommendations were approved by the European Council during a summit on 23 June.

On 14 December 2023, the European Council granted candidate status to Georgia, agreed to open accession negotiations with Ukraine and Moldova, and announced that the opening of accession negotiations with Bosnia and Herzegovina would be reconsidered once certain conditions were met with an update expected in March 2024. On 9 July 2024 the European Union halted Georgia's accession into the European union after their authorities adopted a new "foreign influence" law which some fear might curb democratic freedom.

=== States not on the agenda ===
Countries that could join the European Union Current members Candidate countries Applicant / potential candidate countries Membership possible Membership rejected Located at least partially in Europe

On 12 March 2024, the European Parliament passed a resolution confirming Armenia meets Maastricht Treaty Article 49 requirements and that the country may apply for EU membership. On 26 March 2025, the Armenian parliament approved a bill calling for the start of the process of Armenia's accession to the European Union.

Iceland applied in 2009 following an economic collapse, but suspended its application after the election of a new government. Following the 2024 Icelandic parliamentary election, the Social Democratic Alliance, Viðreisn and People's Party formed a new coalition government, which later agreed to hold a referendum on resuming negotiations on EU membership on 29 August 2026. The result was that EU membership was rejected by Iceland's voters. The outcome was reported as an unwelcome one for Brussels, where EU officials had regarded Iceland as a comparatively straightforward candidate whose accession might have reduced scepticism about further enlargement of the European Union and strengthened the bloc's position at a time of increased attention to Arctic security. Iceland would have been the first net contributor to the EU budget to accede since Austria, Finland and Sweden in 1995.

Norway has completed membership negotiations twice, in 1972 and 1994, but both times membership was rejected in a referendum. The application remains frozen.

Switzerland applied for membership in 1992 but subsequently froze its application. It formally withdrew it in 2016.

=== Associate membership ===
In September 2026, European Commission President Ursula von der Leyen proposed opening the door for Canada to become the EU's first associate member. European Parliament President Roberta Metsola later said that other "like-minded" countries such as Australia and New Zealand may also be considered for this status.

== See also ==
- Accession Treaty of Spain to the European Economic Community – Treaty of 1985
- Eastern Partnership – EU project with Armenia, Azerbaijan, Belarus, Georgia, Moldova and Ukraine
- Enlargement of NATO – Accession of new countries to NATO
- Enlargement of the African Union – Accession of new countries to the AU
- Enlargement of the eurozone – Adoption of the euro by more countries
- Enlargement of the United Nations – Accession of additional states to the UN
- Euronest Parliamentary Assembly – European inter-parliamentary forum
- European Economic Area – European free trade zone established in 1994
- European Free Trade Association – Regional trade organisation and free trade area
- European integration – Process of integration of states in and around Europe
- Foreign relations of the European Union
- Potential enlargement of the European Union – Potential candidates for admission into the European Union
- Referendums related to the European Union
- Schengen Area – Group of European states without mutual border controls
- Treaty of Accession 1994 – 1994 European Union treaty
- Treaty of Accession 2003 – Expansion of the European Union
- Treaty of Accession 2005 – Agreement expanding the European Union
- Treaty of Accession 2011 – Treaty between Croatia and the EU
- Union for the Mediterranean – Intergovernmental organization
- Withdrawal from the European Union – Legal process of Article 50 of the Treaty of European Union
