= Overseas Countries and Territories Association =

International organization founded in 2000

- Association des pays et territoires d’outre-mer de l’Union européenne
- Abbreviation: OCTA
- Formation: 17 November 2000; 25 years ago
- Type: International organization
- Purpose: Economic and social cooperation
- Headquarters: Brussels, Belgium
- Region served: Special member state territories of the EU
- Members: 13
- Official language: English, French
- Chairman: (New Caledonia) Louis Mapou
- Website: Overseas-Association.eu/

Overseas Countries and Territories Association (OCTA; French: Association des pays et territoires d'outre-mer de l'Union européenne, PTOM) is an international organization founded on 17 November 2000 during the conference of prime ministers of overseas countries and territories in Brussels, Belgium. It includes almost all special member state territories of the European Union whose purpose is to improve economic development in overseas countries and territories and cooperation with the European Union. It currently has 13 members. On 25 June 2008, a Cooperation Treaty between the EU and OCTA was signed in Brussels.

Prior to Brexit, until 31 January 2020, there had been 22 Overseas Countries and Territories associated with the European Union and members of OCTA.

== Chairmen ==
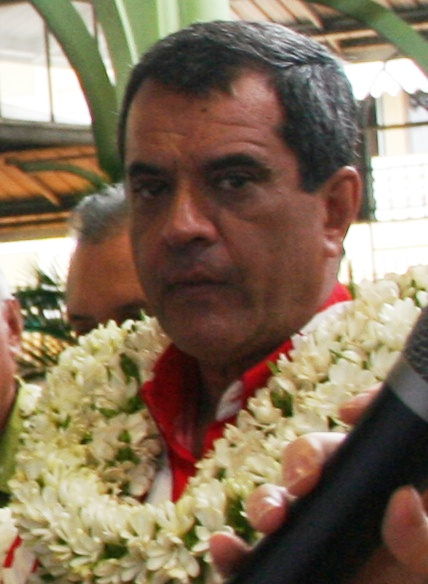
Édouard Fritch, President of French Polynesia and the OCTA Chairman in 2018.

Since 2011, the chairmen are chosen annually and their function is to head the organization and elect an Executive Committee. The current and previous chairmen are:

- Reuben Meade, Premier of Montserrat (1 January – 31 December 2011)
- Kuupik Kleist, Prime Minister of Greenland (1 January – 31 December 2012)
- Stéphane Artano, President of the Territorial Council of Saint Pierre and Miquelon (1 January – 31 December 2013)
- Orlando Smith, Premier of British Virgin Islands (1 January 2014 – 26 February 2015)
- Ivar Asjes, Prime Minister of Curaçao (26 February 2015 – 31 August 2015)
- Bernard Whiteman, Prime Minister of Curaçao (31 August 2015 – 25 February 2016)
- Michiel Godfried Eman, Prime Minister of Aruba (25 February 2016 – 23 February 2017)
- Sharlene Cartwright Robinson, Premier of the Turks and Caicos Islands (23 February 2017 – 22 February 2018)
- Édouard Fritch, President of French Polynesia (22 February 2018 – 27 February 2019)
- Eugene Rhuggenaath, Prime Minister of Curaçao (27 February 2019 – 8 December 2020)
- Thierry Santa, President of New Caledonia (8 December 2020 – 22 July 2021)
- Louis Mapou, President of New Caledonia (since 22 July 2021)

== OCTA members ==
The members of OCTA are:

| Member | Location | Status |
|---|---|---|
| Aruba | Caribbean | Constituent country of the Kingdom of the Netherlands |
| Bonaire | Caribbean | Special municipality of the Netherlands |
| Curaçao | Caribbean | Constituent country of the Kingdom of the Netherlands |
| French Polynesia | Pacific Ocean | Overseas country of France |
| French Southern and Antarctic Lands | Indian Ocean and Antarctica | Overseas territory of France |
| Greenland | North America and Arctic | (Danish Realm) Autonomous territory within the Kingdom of Denmark |
| New Caledonia | Pacific Ocean | Special collectivity of France |
| Saba | Caribbean | Special municipality of the Netherlands |
| Saint Barthélemy | Caribbean | Overseas collectivity of France |
| Sint Eustatius | Caribbean | Special municipality of the Netherlands |
| Saint Pierre and Miquelon | North America | Overseas collectivity of France |
| Sint Maarten | Caribbean | Constituent country of the Kingdom of the Netherlands |
| Wallis and Futuna | Pacific Ocean | Overseas collectivity of France |

=== Former members ===
| Member | Location | Status |
|---|---|---|
| Anguilla | Caribbean | (United Kingdom) British Overseas Territory |
| Bermuda | Atlantic Ocean | (United Kingdom) British Overseas Territory |
| British Virgin Islands | Caribbean | (United Kingdom) British Overseas Territory |
| Cayman Islands | Caribbean | (United Kingdom) British Overseas Territory |
| Falkland Islands | Atlantic Ocean | (United Kingdom) British Overseas Territory |
| Mayotte | Indian Ocean | Overseas department of France (former overseas collectivity) |
| Montserrat | Caribbean | (United Kingdom) British Overseas Territory |
| Pitcairn Islands | Pacific Ocean | (United Kingdom) British Overseas Territory |
| Saint Helena, Ascension and Tristan da Cunha | Atlantic Ocean | (United Kingdom) British Overseas Territory |
| Turks and Caicos Islands | Caribbean | (United Kingdom) British Overseas Territory |

== Political dialogue between EU, OCTA, and EU member states ==
The forum between OCTs, European Union and its member states to which OCTs are linked, has been held annually since 2003 alternating between Brussels (Belgium) and an OCT:

1. September 2002 – Brussels (Belgium)
2. December 2003 – Brussels (Belgium)
3. March 2005 – Papeete (French Polynesia)
4. December 2005 – Brussels (Belgium)
5. September 2006 – Nuuk (Greenland)
6. November 2007 – Brussels (Belgium)
7. November 2008 – George Town (Cayman Islands)
8. March 2010 – Brussels (Belgium)
9. March 2011 – Nouméa (New Caledonia)
10. January 2012 – Brussels (Belgium)
11. September 2012 – Ilulissat (Greenland)
12. December 2013 – Brussels (Belgium)
13. February 2015 – Road Town (British Virgin Islands)
14. February 2016 – Brussels (Belgium)
15. February 2017 – Oranjestad (Aruba)
16. February 2018 – Brussels (Belgium)
17. February 2019 – Tahiti (French Polynesia)
18. December 2020 – online
19. November 2022 - Nouméa (New Caledonia)
20. February 2024 - Brussels (Belgium)

== See also ==
- European Union
- Special member state territories and the European Union
