= Special territories of members of the European Economic Area =

Overseas Countries and Territories
- European Union

- Location of the European Union and the special territories
- Largest settlements: Las Palmas; Santa Cruz de Tenerife; Ponta Delgada; Funchal; Willemstad; Nouméa; Cayenne; Saint-Denis; Mamoudzou; Fort-de-France; Les Abymes
- Official language: Spanish; French; Dutch; Portuguese; English; Swedish; Faroese; Danish; Greenlandic; Greek; Italian; German; Papiamento; (depends on the territory)
- Special territory: 9 Outermost Regions: Azores; Canary Islands; French Guiana; Guadeloupe; Réunion; Madeira; Martinique; Mayotte; Saint Martin; 13 Overseas Countries and Territories: Aruba; Bonaire; Curaçao; French Polynesia; French Southern and Antarctic Lands; Greenland; New Caledonia; Saba; Saint Barthélemy; Saint Pierre and Miquelon; Sint Eustatius; Sint Maarten; Wallis and Futuna; 10 Special Cases: Åland; Büsingen am Hochrhein; Campione d'Italia; Ceuta; Faroe Islands; Heligoland; Livigno; Melilla; Mount Athos; United Nations Buffer Zone in Cyprus

Area
  - Total: 2,733,792 km^{2} (1,055,523 sq mi)

Population
  - Estimate: 6,297,986
- Currency: Euro (EUR; €) — OMRs, 3 OCTs (Note: Saint Pierre and Miquelon, Saint Barthélemy and the French Southern and Antarctic Lands) and 9 special cases (Note: Åland, Ceuta, Melilla, Heligoland, Livigno and Mount Athos; de jure in Büsingen am Hochrhein, Campione d'Italia and the UN Buffer Zone in Cyprus.) 5 others: Aruban florin (AWG) — Aruba; CFP franc (XPF) — New Caledonia, French Polynesia, Wallis and Futuna; Danish krone (DKK) — Greenland; Faroese króna (DKK) — Faroe Islands (Note: The Faroese króna is not a separate currency, but a local issue of the Danish krone); Caribbean guilder (XCG) — Curaçao, Sint Maarten; United States dollar (USD) — Bonaire, Sint Eustatius, Saba
- Date format: dd/mm/yyyy (AD)

The European Economic Area (EEA) has 32 special territories of EU member states and EFTA member states which, for historical, geographical, or political reasons, enjoy special statuses within or outside the European Union and the European Free Trade Association.

The special territories of EU member states are categorised under three headings: nine Outermost Regions (OMR) that form part of the European Union, though they benefit from derogations from some EU laws due to their geographical remoteness from mainland Europe; thirteen Overseas Countries and Territories (OCT) that do not form part of the European Union, though they cooperate with the EU via the Overseas Countries and Territories Association; and ten special cases that form part of the European Union (with the exception of the Faroe Islands), though EU laws make ad hoc provisions. The Outermost Regions were recognised at the signing of the Maastricht Treaty in 1992, and confirmed by the Treaty of Lisbon in 2007.

The Treaty on the Functioning of the European Union states that both primary and secondary European Union law applies automatically to the outermost regions, with possible derogations due to the particularities of these territories. The Overseas Countries and Territories are recognised by Article 198 of the Treaty on the Functioning of the European Union which allows them to opt into EU provisions on the freedom of movement for workers and freedom of establishment, and invites them to join the Overseas Countries and Territories Association (OCTA) in order to improve cooperation with the European Union. The status of an uninhabited territory, Clipperton, remains unclear since it is not explicitly mentioned in primary EU law and has a sui generis status at the national level. (Note: The Clipperton Island is a private property of the French State. The Scattered Islands were regarded as "residual territories of the Republic" until 2007. They are now a district of the French Southern and Antarctic Lands.) Collectively, the special territories encompass a population of some 6.1 million people and a land area of about 2,733,792 square kilometres (1,055,500 sq mi). Around 80 percent of this area is represented by Greenland. The largest region by population, the Canary Islands, accounts for more than a third of the total population of the special territories. The smallest by land area is the island of Saba in the Caribbean (13 km^{2} or 5 sq mi). The French Southern and Antarctic Lands is the only special territory without a permanent population.

== Outermost Regions ==
The Outermost Regions (OMR) are territories forming part of a member state of the European Union but situated a significant distance from mainland Europe. Due to this situation, they have derogation from some EU policies despite being part of the European Union.

According to the Treaty on the Functioning of the European Union, both primary and secondary European Union law applies automatically to these territories, with possible derogations to take account of their "structural social and economic situation (...) which is compounded by their remoteness, insularity, small size, difficult topography and climate, economic dependence on a few products, the permanence and combination of which severely restrain their development". All form part of the European Union customs area; however, some fall outside of the Schengen Area and the European Union Value Added Tax Area.

Seven Outermost Regions were recognised at the signing of the Maastricht Treaty in 1992. The Treaty of Lisbon included two additional territories (Saint Barthélemy and Saint Martin) in 2007. Saint Barthélemy changed its status from OMR to OCT with effect from 1 January 2012. Mayotte, which was an OCT, joined the EU as an OMR with effect from 1 January 2014.

The 9 Outermost Regions of the European Union are:

Flag	Coat of arms	Name	Location	Area	Pop.	Capital	Largest settlement	Official language	State
		Azores	North Atlantic	2,333 km^{2} (901 sq mi)	236,440	Angra do Heroísmo, Horta and Ponta Delgada	Ponta Delgada	Portuguese	Portugal
		Madeira	North Atlantic	801 km^{2} (309 sq mi)	250,769	Funchal		Portuguese	Portugal
		Canary Islands	North Atlantic	7,493 km^{2} (2,893 sq mi)	2,268,035	Santa Cruz de Tenerife and Las Palmas	Las Palmas	Spanish	Spain
		French Guiana	South America	83,534 km^{2} (32,253 sq mi)	292,354	Cayenne		French	France
		Guadeloupe	Caribbean	1,628 km^{2} (629 sq mi)	380,387	Basse-Terre	Les Abymes	French	France
		Martinique	Caribbean	1,128 km^{2} (436 sq mi)	355,459	Fort-de-France		French	France
		Saint Martin	Caribbean	53 km^{2} (20 sq mi)	36,286	Marigot		French	France
		Mayotte	Indian Ocean	374 km^{2} (144 sq mi)	320,901	Mamoudzou		French	France
		Réunion	Indian Ocean	2,511 km^{2} (970 sq mi)	896,175	Saint-Denis		French	France
		Total		99,855 km^{2} (38,554 sq mi)	5,036,806				

=== Autonomous Regions of Portugal ===
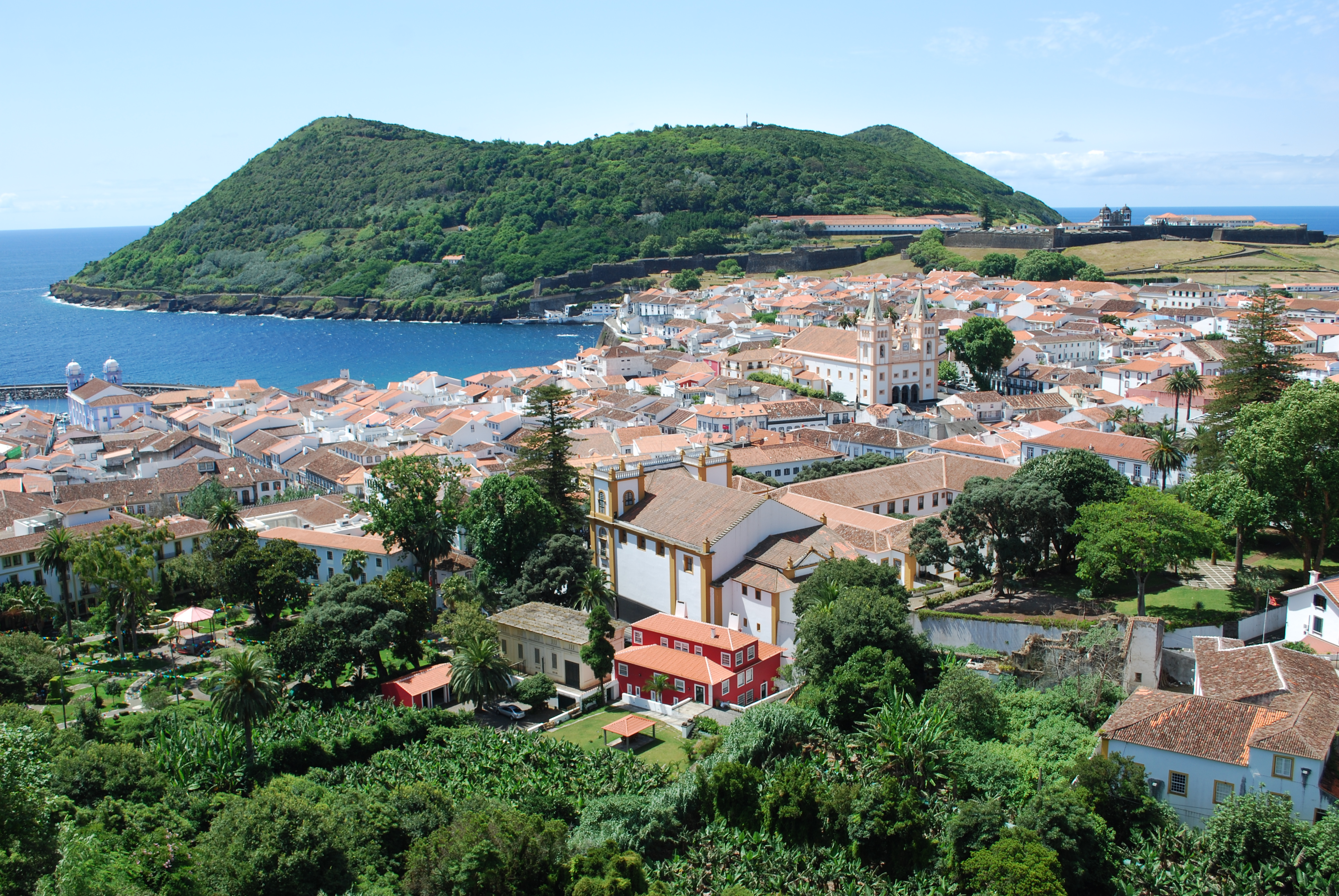
Angra do Heroísmo, oldest continuously settled town in the archipelago of the Azores and UNESCO World Heritage Site

Azores and Madeira are two groups of Portuguese islands in the Atlantic. Azores and Madeira are integral parts of the Portuguese Republic, but both have the special status as Autonomous Regions, with a degree of self-governance. Some derogations from the application of EU law apply in regards to taxation, fishing and transportation. Their VAT is lower than the rest of Portugal, but they are not outside the EU VAT Area.

=== Canary Islands ===
The Canary Islands are a Spanish archipelago off the African coast which form one of the 17 autonomous communities of Spain–the country's principal first-level administrative division. They are outside the EU VAT Area. The Canary Islands are the most populous and economically strongest territory of all the outermost regions in the European Union. The outermost regions office for support and information is located in these islands, in the city of Las Palmas on the island of Gran Canaria.

=== French overseas regions ===
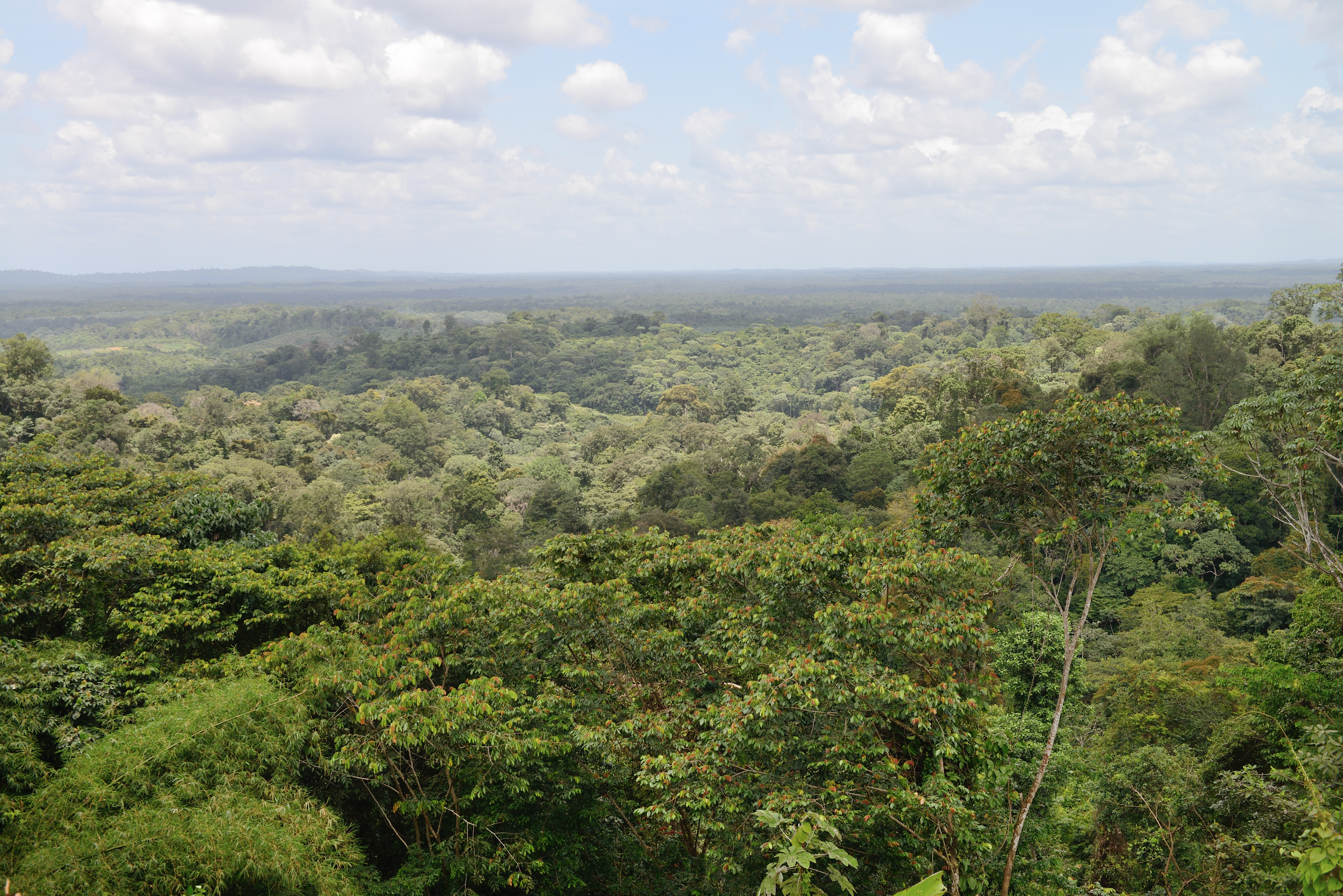
French Guiana tropical forest, looking toward Cacao

French Guiana, Guadeloupe, Martinique, Mayotte, and Réunion are five French overseas regions (which are also overseas departments) which under French law are treated as integral parts of the Republic that are geographically unique. The euro is legal tender; however, they are outside the Schengen Area and the EU VAT Area.

Mayotte is the newest of the five overseas departments, having changed from an overseas collectivity with OCT status on 31 March 2011. It became an outermost region, and thus part of the EU, on 1 January 2014.

=== Collectivity of Saint Martin ===
Saint Martin is the only overseas collectivity of France with the status of being an Outermost Region of the EU. As with the French overseas departments, the euro is legal tender in Saint Martin, and it is outside the Schengen Area and the EU VAT Area.

On 22 February 2007, Saint Martin and Saint Barthélemy were broken away from the French overseas department of Guadeloupe to form new overseas collectivities. As a consequence their EU status was unclear for a time. While a report issued by the French parliament suggested that the islands remained within the EU as outermost regions, European Commission documents listed them as being outside the European Community. The legal status of the islands was clarified on the coming into force of the Treaty of Lisbon, which listed them as an outermost region. However, Saint Barthélemy ceased being an outermost region and left the EU, to become an OCT, on 1 January 2012.

== Overseas countries and territories ==
The overseas countries and territories (OCT) are dependent territories that have a special relationship with one of the member states of the EU. Their status is described in the Treaty on the Functioning of the European Union, and they are not part of the EU or the European Single Market. The Overseas Countries and Territories Association was created to improve economic development and cooperation between the OCTs and the EU,

The OCTs have been explicitly invited by the EU treaty to join the EU-OCT Association (OCTA). They were listed in the Article 198 of the Treaty on the Functioning of the European Union, which aside from inviting them to join OCTA, also provided them the opportunity to opt into EU provisions on the freedom of movement for workers and freedom of establishment. Yet, the freedom of establishment is limited by Article 203 TFEU and the respective Council Decision on OCTs. Its Article 51(1)(a) prescribes only that "the Union shall accord to natural and legal persons of the OCTs a treatment no less favourable than the most favourable treatment applicable to like natural and legal persons of any third country with whom the Union concludes or has concluded an economic integration agreement." Again this can be, according to Article 51(2)(b) limited. The obligations provided for in paragraph 1 of this Article shall not apply to treatment granted under measures providing for recognition of qualifications, licences or prudential measures in accordance with Article VII of the General Agreement on Trade in Services (GATS) or the GATS Annex on Financial Services.

The OCTs are not subject to the EU's common external customs tariffs but may claim customs on goods imported from the EU on a non-discriminatory basis. They are not part of the EU and the EU acquis does not apply to them, though those joining OCTA are required to respect the detailed rules and procedures outlined by this association agreement (Council Decision 2013/755/EU). OCTA members are entitled to ask for EU financial support.

When the Rome Treaty was signed in March 1957, a total of 15 OCTs existed: French West Africa, French Equatorial Africa, Saint Pierre and Miquelon, Comoros Archipelago, French Madagascar, French Somaliland, New Caledonia, French Polynesia, French Southern and Antarctic Lands, French Togoland, French Cameroons, Belgian Congo, Ruanda-Urundi, Trust Territory of Somalia, Netherlands New Guinea. The list was since then revised multiple times, and comprised—as noted by the Lisbon Treaty—25 OCTs in 2007. One of the French territories subsequently switched status from OMR to OCT (Saint Barthélemy), while another French territory switched from OCT to OMR (Mayotte). As of July 2014, there are still 13 OCTs (six with France, six with the Netherlands and one with Denmark) of which all have joined OCTA.

The 13 Overseas Countries and Territories of the European Union are:

Flag	Coat of arms	Name	Location	Area	Pop.	Capital	Largest settlement	Official language(s)	Sovereign state
		Greenland	North Atlantic and Arctic	2,166,086 km^{2} (836,330 sq mi)	56,542	Nuuk		Greenlandic	(Danish Realm) Kingdom of Denmark
		Curaçao	Caribbean	444 km^{2} (171 sq mi)	155,826	Willemstad		Dutch, Papiamento, English	Kingdom of the Netherlands
		Aruba	Caribbean	179 km^{2} (69 sq mi)	109,435	Oranjestad		Dutch, Papiamento	Kingdom of the Netherlands
		Sint Maarten	Caribbean	37 km^{2} (14 sq mi)	58,477	Philipsburg	Lower Prince's Quarter	Dutch, English	Kingdom of the Netherlands
		Bonaire	Caribbean	294 km^{2} (114 sq mi)	26,552	Kralendijk		Dutch	Kingdom of the Netherlands
		Sint Eustatius	Caribbean	21 km^{2} (8 sq mi)	3,270	Oranjestad		Dutch	Kingdom of the Netherlands
		Saba	Caribbean	13 km^{2} (5 sq mi)	2,158	The Bottom		Dutch	Kingdom of the Netherlands
		French Polynesia	Pacific	4,167 km^{2} (1,609 sq mi)	278,786	Papeete	Faʻaʻā	French	French Republic
		New Caledonia	Pacific	18,576 km^{2} (7,172 sq mi)	264,596	Nouméa		French	French Republic
		Wallis-et-Futuna	Pacific	142 km^{2} (55 sq mi)	11,151	Mata Utu		French	French Republic
		Saint Barthélemy	Caribbean	25 km^{2} (10 sq mi)	9,279	Gustavia		French	French Republic
		Saint Pierre and Miquelon	North Atlantic	242 km^{2} (93 sq mi)	5,819	Saint-Pierre		French	French Republic
		French Southern and Antarctic Lands	Indian Ocean and Antarctica	439,781 km^{2} (169,800 sq mi)	0 (Note: 150 non-permanent in winter, 310 in summer (research and military personnel))	Saint-Pierre	Port-aux-Français (base)	French	French Republic
		Total		2,630,007 km^{2} (1,015,451 sq mi)	981,891				

=== Overseas Countries and Territories Association ===
The Overseas Countries and Territories Association (OCTA) is an organisation founded on 17 November 2000 and headquartered in Brussels. All OCTs have joined OCTA as of February 2020. Its purpose is to improve economic development in overseas countries and territories, as well as cooperation with the European Union. On 25 June 2008, a Cooperation Treaty between the EU and OCTA was signed in Brussels. The current chairman is Louis Mapou.

=== French overseas territories ===
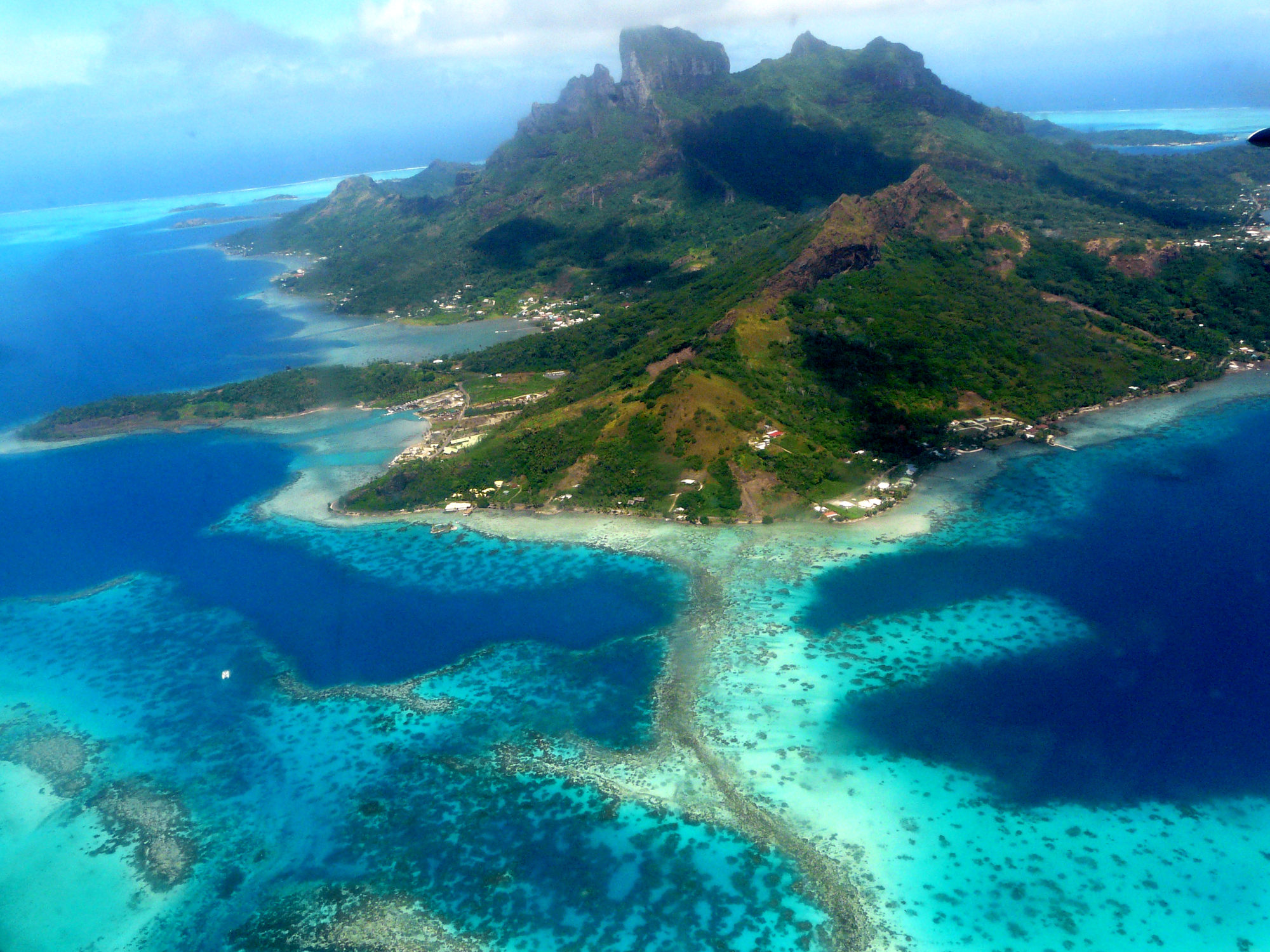
Bora Bora, in French Polynesia

The French Southern and Antarctic Lands (which also include the French Scattered Islands in the Indian Ocean, and the French claim of Adélie Land in Antarctica) is a French Overseas Territory but has no permanent population. It has sui generis status within France.

Saint Pierre and Miquelon, Saint Barthélemy, French Polynesia, and Wallis and Futuna are overseas collectivities (formerly referred to as overseas territories) of France, while New Caledonia is a "sui generis collectivity". Saint Barthélemy and Saint Pierre and Miquelon use the euro, while New Caledonia, French Polynesia and Wallis and Futuna use the CFP Franc, a currency which is tied to the euro and guaranteed by France. Natives of the collectivities are European citizens owing to their French citizenship and elections to the European Parliament are held in the collectivities.

On 22 February 2007, Saint Barthélemy and Saint Martin were separated from the French overseas department of Guadeloupe to form new overseas collectivities. As a consequence, their EU status was unclear for a time. While a report issued by the French parliament suggested that the islands remained within the EU as outermost regions, European Commission documents listed them as being outside the European Community. The legal status of the islands was clarified on the coming into force of the Lisbon Treaty which listed them as outermost regions. However, Saint Barthélemy ceased being an outermost region and left the EU, to become an OCT, on 1 January 2012. The change was made to facilitate trade with countries outside the EU, notably the United States, and was made possible by a provision of the Lisbon Treaty which allows the European Council to change the EU status of a Danish, Dutch, or French territory on the initiative of the member state concerned.

=== Dutch overseas territories ===
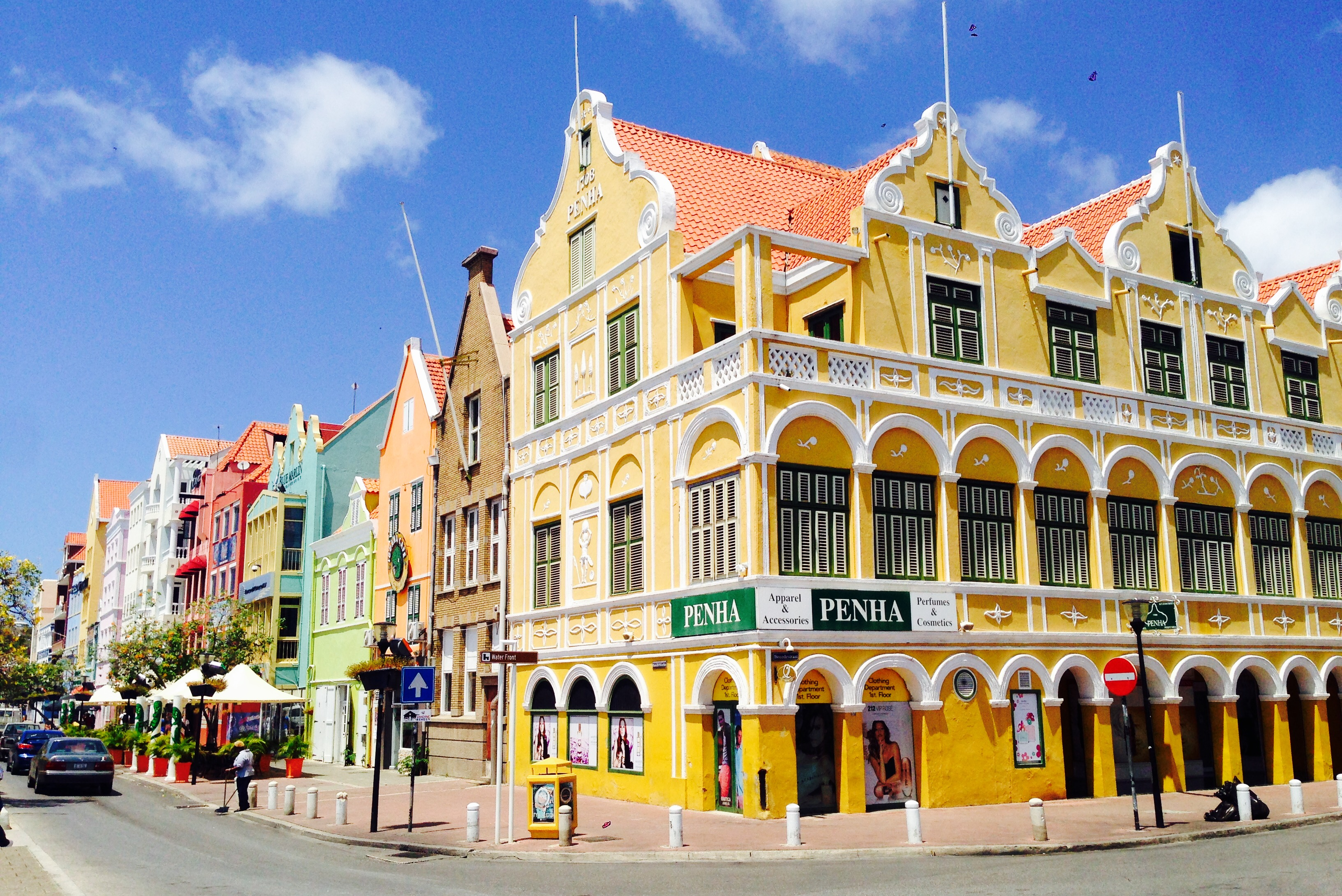
Willemstad, the capital city of Curaçao

Six territories of the Netherlands—all of which are Caribbean islands—have OCT status. As such, they benefit from being able to have their own export and import policy to and from the EU, while still having access to various EU funds (such as the European Development Fund). The inhabitants of the islands are EU citizens owing to their Dutch citizenship, with the right to vote in elections to the European Parliament. Initially they did not have voting rights for such elections, but the European Court of Justice granted them such rights, when they ruled their exclusion from the franchise was contrary to EU law, as all other Dutch citizens resident outside the EU did have the right to vote. None of the islands use the euro as their currency. The US dollar is used on Bonaire, Sint Eustatius and Saba, while Curaçao and Sint Maarten utilize their own shared currency the Caribbean guilder, and finally the currency of Aruba is the Aruban florin.

Aruba, Curaçao, and Sint Maarten are classified as "countries" under Dutch law, and have considerable internal autonomy. In June 2008, the Dutch government published a report on the projected effect on the islands were they to join the EU as outermost regions. It concluded that the choice would be for the islands themselves to weigh up the advantages and disadvantages of becoming part of the EU as outermost regions, and that nothing would be done absent the islands specifically requesting it.

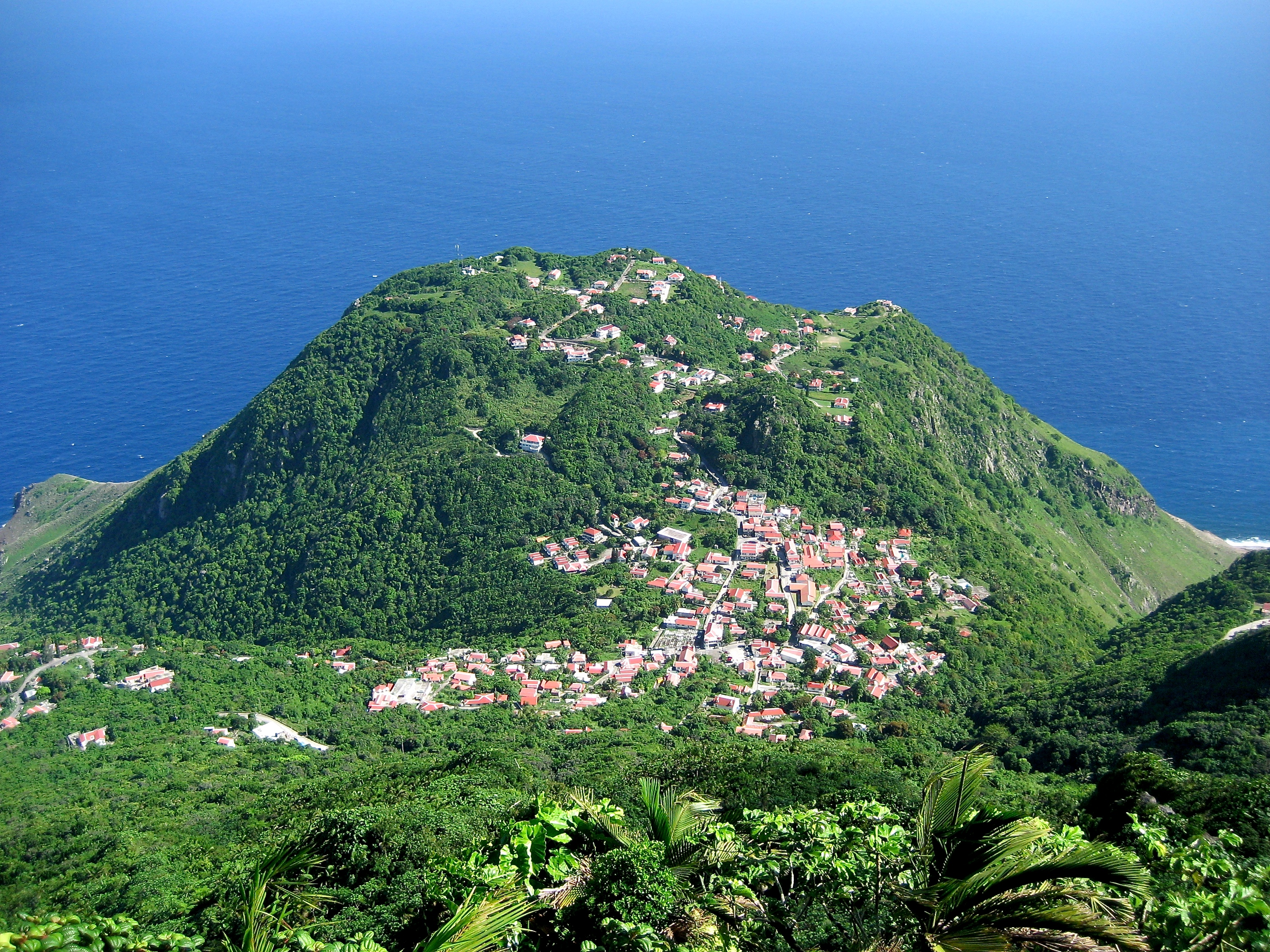
Mount Scenery, Saba

Bonaire, Sint Eustatius, and Saba (collectively called Caribbean Netherlands) are "special municipalities" of the Netherlands proper. Their current OCT status, and the prospect of advancing their status to become part of the EU as new OMRs (outermost regions), was reviewed by the Dutch parliament in 2015, as part of the planned review of the Dutch law (WOLBES and FINBES) concerning the quality of their recently implemented new public administration bodies. In October 2015, the review concluded the present legal structures for governance and integration with European Netherlands was not working well within the framework of WolBES, but no recommendations were made in regards of whether a switch from OCT to OMR status would help improve this situation.

The islands inherited their OCT status from the Netherlands Antilles which was dissolved in 2010. The Netherlands Antilles were initially specifically excluded from all association with the EEC by reason of a protocol attached to the Treaty of Rome, allowing the Netherlands to ratify on behalf of the Netherlands in Europe and Netherlands New Guinea only, which it subsequently did. Following the entry into force of the Convention on the association of the Netherlands Antilles with the European Economic Community on 1 October 1964, however, the Netherlands Antilles became OCTs.

=== Greenland ===
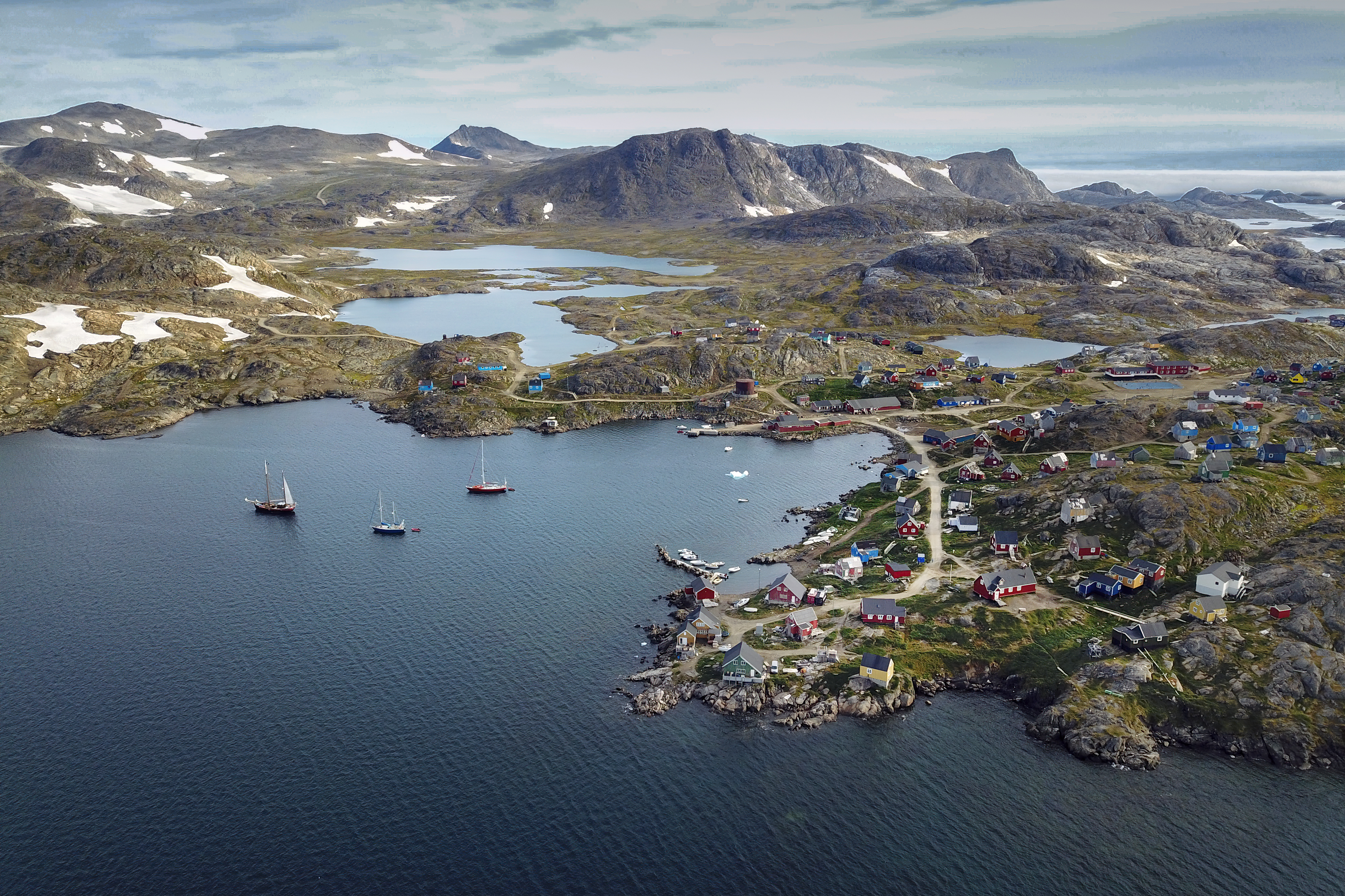
Kulusuk, in Greenland

Greenland joined the then European Community in 1973 as a county along with Denmark, but after gaining autonomy with the introduction of home rule within the Kingdom of Denmark, Greenland voted to leave in 1982 and left in 1985, to become an OCT. The main reason for leaving is disagreements about the Common Fisheries Policy (CFP) and to regain control of Greenlandic fish resources to subsequently remain outside EU waters. Greenlandic nationals (OCT nationals) are, nonetheless, EU citizens due to Greenland's associated relationship with the EU within the meaning of EU treaties as well as holding Danish nationality.

The EU–Greenland relationship is a comprehensive partnership, which is complementary to the OCT association arrangements under "Council Decision 2013/755/EU"; based specifically on "Council Decision 2014/137 of 14 March 2014" (outlining the relations) and the Fisheries Partnership Agreement of 30 July 2006.

== Special cases ==
While the outermost regions and the overseas countries and territories fall into structured categories to which common mechanisms apply, this is not true of all the special territories. 10 member state territories have ad hoc arrangements in their relationship with the EU. In those special cases, VAT rules do not apply and they may also be exempt from customs or excise rules.

Flag	Coat of arms	Name	Area	Pop.	Official language(s)	Sovereign state	Part of the EU	Customs Union	VAT rules	Excise rules
		Melilla	12.3 km^{2} (5 sq mi)	87,067	Spanish	Spain	Yes	No	No, IPSI	No
		Ceuta	18.5 km^{2} (7 sq mi)	83,567	Spanish	Spain	Yes	No	No, IPSI	No
		Åland	1,580 km^{2} (610 sq mi)	30,654	Swedish	Finland	Yes	Yes	No, local	No
		Faroe Islands	1,399 km^{2} (540 sq mi)	56,210	Faroese, Danish	Kingdom of Denmark	No	No	No, local	No
		United Nations Buffer Zone in Cyprus (Note: Villages in the buffer zone are legally administered by the Republic of Cyprus. The application of EU acquis communautaire is suspended in territories where the Republic of Cyprus does not exercise effective control. Northern Cyprus is a de facto state that is partially dependent on Turkey.)	346 km^{2} (134 sq mi)	8,686		Cyprus (de jure)	Yes	Yes (Note: With exceptions)	No	Yes
		Livigno	227.3 km^{2} (88 sq mi)	6,680	Italian	Italy	Yes	No	No (no VAT)	No
		Campione d'Italia (Note: Including the Italian national waters of Lake Lugano.)	2.68 km^{2} (1 sq mi)	1,845	Italian	Italy	Yes	Yes	No, Swiss (rate only) (Note: Not part of Swiss VAT area, but Swiss VAT rate is applied as local consumption tax.)	Yes
		Büsingen am Hochrhein	7.62 km^{2} (3 sq mi)	1,440	German	Germany	Yes	No, Swiss customs	No, Swiss VAT	No
		Heligoland	1.7 km^{2} (1 sq mi)	1,329	German	Germany	Yes	No	No (no VAT)	No
		Mount Athos	335.63 km^{2} (130 sq mi)	1,811	Greek	Greece	Yes	Yes	No (no VAT)	Yes
		Total	3,930 km^{2} (1,517 sq mi)	279,289						

=== Åland ===
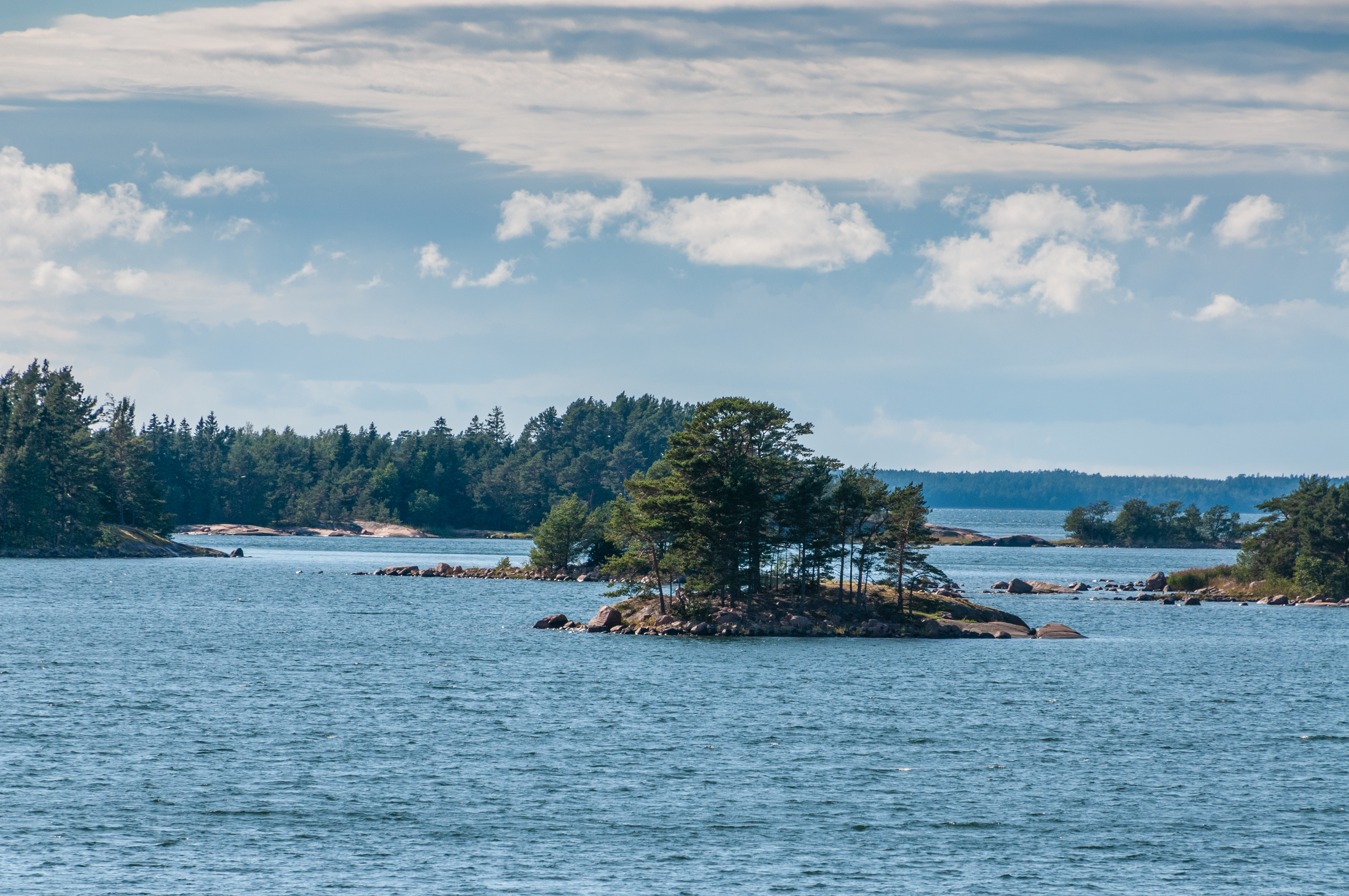
Föglö islands in Åland

Åland, an autonomous archipelago belonging to Finland, but with partial autonomy, located between Sweden and Finland, with a Swedish-speaking population, joined the EU along with Finland in 1995. The islands had a separate referendum on accession and like the Finnish mainland voted in favour.

EU law, including the fundamental four freedoms, applies to Åland. However, there are some derogations due to the islands' special status. Åland is outside the VAT area and is exempt from common rules in relation to turnover taxes, excise duties and indirect taxation. In addition, to protect the local economy, the treaty of accession allows for a concept of hembygdsrätt/kotiseutuoikeus (regional citizenship). Consequently, there are restrictions on the holding of property and real estate, the right of establishment for business purposes and limitations on who can provide services in Åland, for people not holding this status. The status may be obtained by any Finnish citizen legally resident in Åland for 5 years who can demonstrate an adequate knowledge of the Swedish language.

=== Büsingen am Hochrhein ===
The German village of Büsingen am Hochrhein is an exclave entirely surrounded by Switzerland and as such is for practical purposes, in a customs union with the latter non-EU country. The euro is legal tender, though the Swiss franc is preferred. Büsingen is excluded from the EU customs union and the EU VAT area. Swiss VAT generally applies.

=== Campione d'Italia and Livigno ===
The Italian exclave village of Campione d'Italia is enclaved by Switzerland's Ticino canton as well as Lake Lugano (or Ceresio), and is a comune in the Province of Como, whilst Livigno, a small and remote mountain resort town, is a comune in the Province of Sondrio. Both comuni are part of the Lombardy region. Although part of the EU, Livigno is excluded from the customs union and VAT area, with Livigno's tax status dating back to Napoleonic times. Campione is excluded from the EU VAT area, instead while technically not part of the Swiss VAT area, the Swiss VAT rate is applied as a local consumption tax. It was excluded from the EU customs area until the end of 2019 and had been de facto part of the Swiss customs area for decades. Shops and restaurants in Campione accept payments in both euros and Swiss francs and prices are displayed in both currencies.

=== Ceuta and Melilla ===
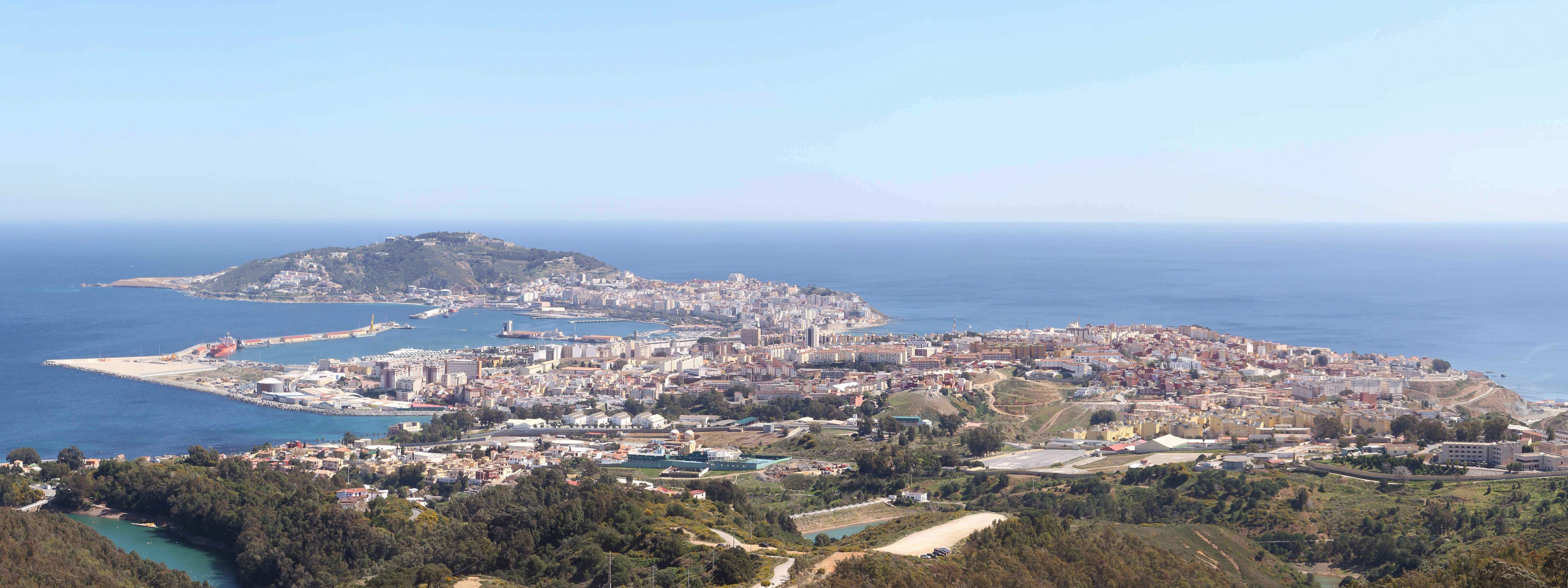
Ceuta in Spanish North Africa

Ceuta and Melilla are two Spanish cities on the North African coast. They are part of the EU but they are excluded from the common agricultural and fisheries policies. They are also outside the customs union and VAT area, but no customs are levied on goods exported from the Union into either Ceuta and Melilla and certain goods originating in Ceuta and Melilla are exempt from customs charges.

While nominally part of the Schengen Area (Schengen visas are valid), Spain performs identity checks on all sea and air passengers leaving the exclaves for elsewhere in the Schengen Area, but not on passengers entering the exclaves from the Schengen Area.

=== Cyprus ===
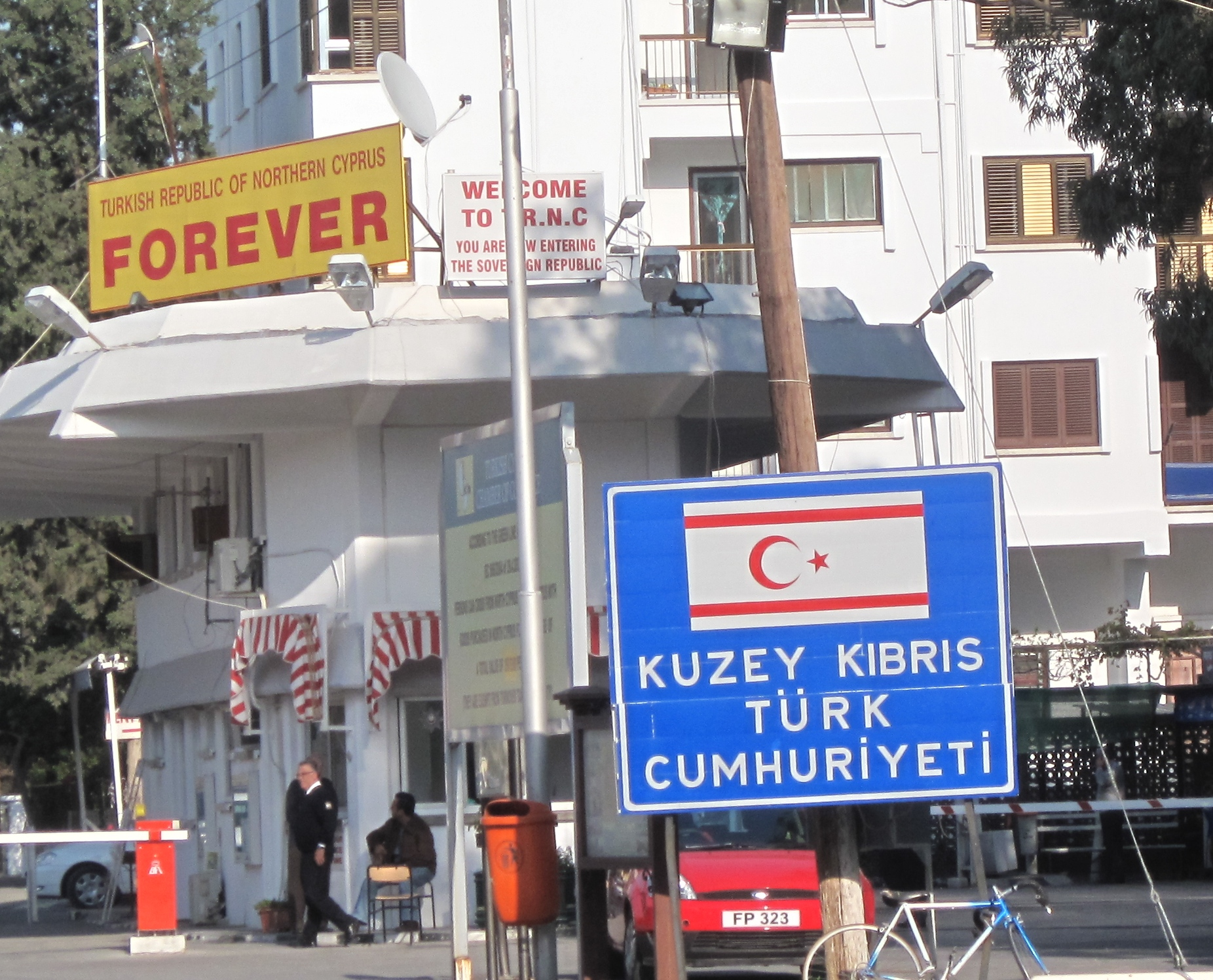
The internationally unrecognised Turkish Republic of Northern Cyprus

When the Republic of Cyprus became part of the European Union on 1 May 2004, the northern third of the island was outside of the effective control of its government due to the Turkish invasion of Cyprus, a United Nations buffer zone of varying width separated the two parts, and a further 3% of the island was taken up by UK sovereign bases (under British sovereignty since the Treaty of Establishment in 1960). Two protocols to the Treaty of Accession 2003—numbers 3 and 10, known as the "Sovereign Base Areas Protocol" and the "Cyprus Protocol" respectively—reflect this complex situation.

EU law only applies fully to the part of the island that is effectively controlled by the government of the Republic of Cyprus. EU law is suspended in the northern third of the island (the Turkish Republic of Northern Cyprus, whose independence is recognised only by Turkey) by article 1(1) of the Cyprus Protocol. If the island is reunified, the Council of the European Union will repeal the suspension by a decision. Four months after such a decision has been adopted, new elections to the European Parliament will be held on the island to elect Cypriot representatives from the whole of the island.

Cypriot nationality law applies to the entire island and is accordingly available to the inhabitants of Northern Cyprus and the British sovereign base areas on the same basis as to those born in the area controlled by the Republic of Cyprus. Citizens of the Republic of Cyprus living in Northern Cyprus are EU citizens and are nominally entitled to vote in elections to the European Parliament; however, elections to that Parliament are not organised in Northern Cyprus as it is governed de facto by a separate state, albeit a state recognized only by Turkey.

==== Akrotiri and Dhekelia ====
The United Kingdom has two sovereign base areas on Cyprus, namely Akrotiri and Dhekelia. Unlike other British overseas territories, their inhabitants (who are entitled to British Overseas Territories citizenship) have never been entitled to British citizenship.

Prior to Cypriot accession to the EU in 2004, although the United Kingdom was an EU member at the time, EU law did not apply to the sovereign base areas. This position was changed by the Cypriot accession treaty so that EU law, while still not applying in principle, applied to the extent necessary to implement a protocol attached to that treaty. This protocol applied EU law relating to the Common Agricultural Policy, customs, indirect taxation, social policy and justice and home affairs to the sovereign base areas. The sovereign base areas' authorities also made provision for the unilateral application of directly applicable EU law. The UK also agreed in the Protocol to keep enough control of the external (i.e. off-island and northern Cyprus) borders of the base areas to ensure that the border between the sovereign base areas and the Republic of Cyprus could remain fully open and would not have to be policed as an external EU border. Consequently, the sovereign base areas would have become a de facto part of the Schengen Area if and when Cyprus implemented it. The base areas are already de facto members of the eurozone due to their previous use of the Cypriot pound and their adoption of the euro as legal tender from 2008.

Because Cypriot nationality law extends to Cypriots in the sovereign base areas, Cypriot residents, as citizens of the Republic of Cyprus, are entitled to EU citizenship. Just under half of the population of the sovereign base areas are Cypriots, the rest are British military personnel, support staff and their dependants. In a declaration attached to the Treaty of Establishment of the Republic of Cyprus of 1960, the British government undertook not to allow new settlement of people in the sovereign base areas other than for temporary purposes.

Under a protocol to the Brexit withdrawal agreement, certain provisions of EU law on agriculture, customs, indirect taxation, social security and border control continue to apply to the sovereign base areas.

==== United Nations buffer zone ====
The United Nations buffer zone between north and south Cyprus ranges in width from a few metres in central Nicosia to several kilometres in the countryside. While it is nominally under the sovereignty of the Republic of Cyprus, it is effectively administered by the United Nations Peacekeeping Force in Cyprus (UNFICYP). The population of the zone is 8,686 (as of October 2007), and one of the mandates of UNFICYP is "to encourage the fullest possible resumption of normal civilian activity in the buffer zone". Inhabited villages located in the buffer zone are legally administered by the Republic of Cyprus but policed by UN peacekeepers. Article 2.1 of the Cyprus Protocol allows the European Council to determine to what extent the provisions of EU law apply in the buffer zone.

=== Faroe Islands ===
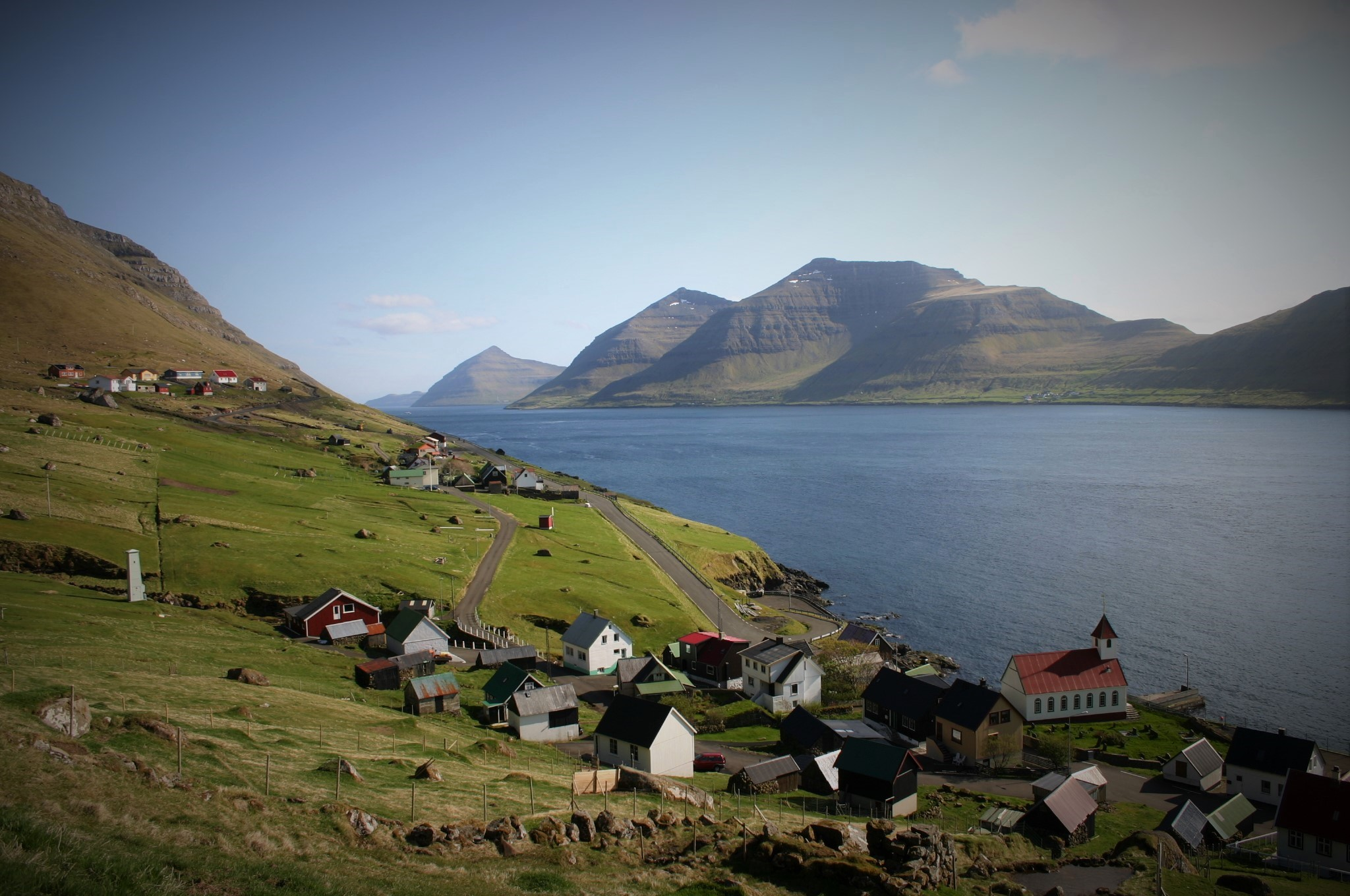
Kunoy island, Faroe Islands

The Faroe Islands have never been part of the EU. Danish citizens residing on the islands are not considered citizens of a member state within the meaning of the treaties or, consequently, citizens of the European Union. However, Faroese people, who are Danish citizens, may become EU citizens by changing their registered residence to the Danish mainland.

The Faroe Islands are not part of the Schengen Area, and Schengen visas are not valid. However, the islands are part of the Nordic Passport Union and the Schengen Agreement provides that travellers passing between the islands and the Schengen Area are not to be treated as passing the external frontier of the Area. This means that there is no formal passport control, but an identity check at check-in for air or boat travel to the islands where Nordic citizens on intra-Nordic travel need no passport, only showing the ticket plus identity card.

=== Heligoland ===
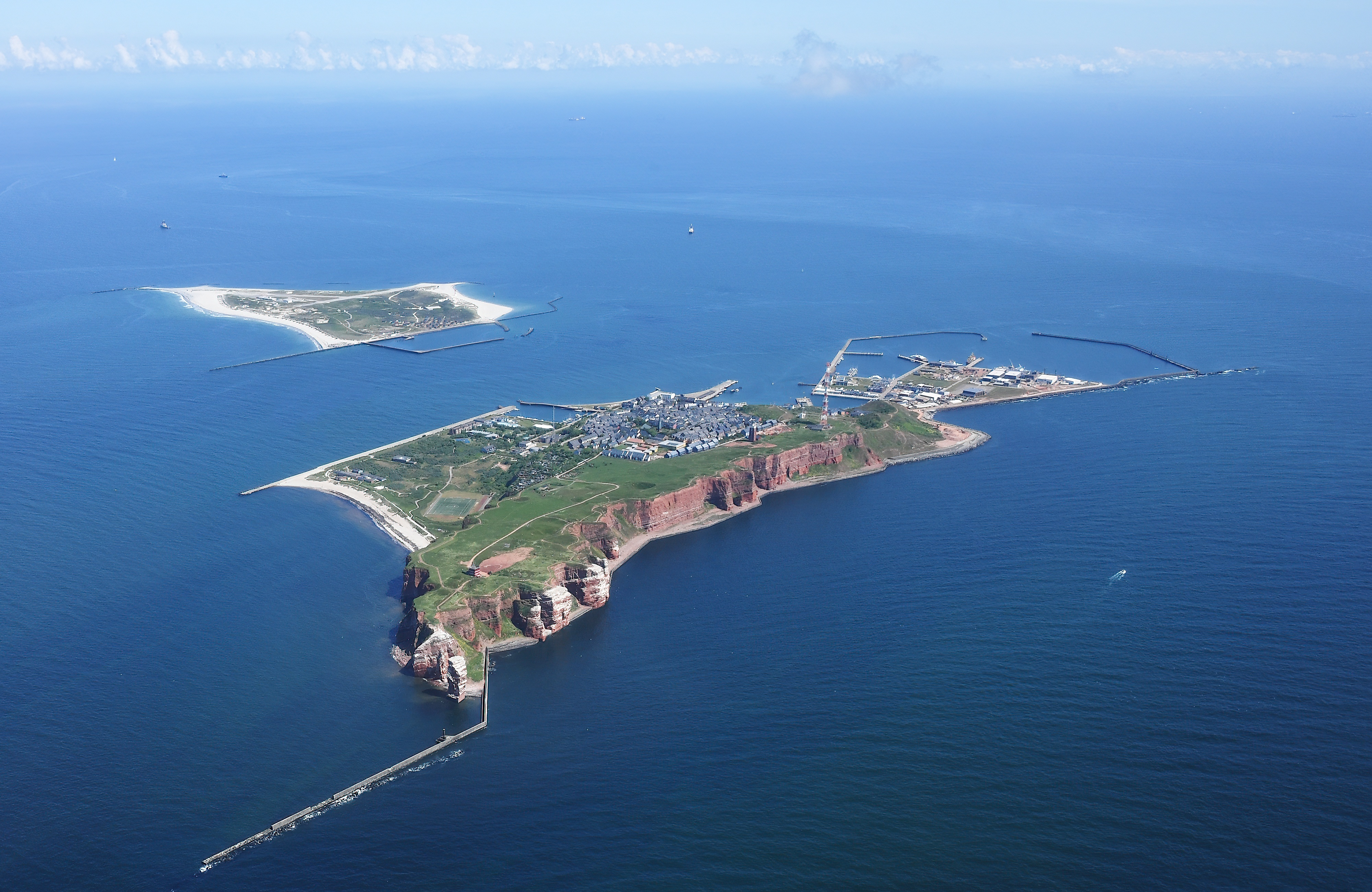
Heligoland

Heligoland is an archipelago of Germany situated in the North Sea 70 km (43 mi) off the German north-western coast. It is part of the EU, but is excluded from the customs union and the VAT area.

=== Mount Athos ===
Mount Athos is an autonomous monastic region of Greece. Greece's EU accession treaty provides that Mount Athos maintains its centuries-old special legal status, guaranteed by article 105 of the Greek Constitution. It is part of the customs union but outside the VAT area. Notwithstanding that a special permit is required to enter the peninsula and that there is a prohibition on the admittance of women, it is part of the Schengen Area. The monastery has certain rights to house monks from countries outside the EU. A declaration attached to Greece's accession treaty to the Schengen Agreement states that Mount Athos's "special status" should be taken into account in the application of the Schengen rules.

=== Plazas de soberanía ===
The plazas de soberanía are small islands and a peninsula scattered along the Moroccan coast which have been integral parts of Spain since the 15th century and therefore are also part of the European Union. Their currency is the euro.

== Areas of extraterritoriality ==
The Saimaa Canal and Värska–Ulitina road are two of several distinct travel arrangements that exist or existed because of changes in borders over the course of the 20th century, where transport routes and installations ended up on the wrong side of the border. Some have become superfluous thanks to the Schengen Agreement. These listed examples pass the external EU border.

=== Saimaa Canal ===
Finland leases the 19.6-kilometre-long (12.2 mi) Russian part of the Saimaa Canal from Russia and is granted extraterritoriality rights. The area is not part of the EU; it is a special part of Russia. Under the treaty signed by Finnish and Russian governments, Russian law is in force with a few exceptions concerning maritime rules and the employment of canal staff which fall under Finnish jurisdiction. There are also special rules concerning vessels travelling to Finland via the canal. Russian visas are not required for just passing through the canal, but a passport is needed and it is checked at the border. Euros are accepted for the canal fees. Prior to the 50-year lease renewal coming into effect in February 2012, the Maly Vysotsky Island had also been leased and managed by Finland. Since then it has been fully managed by Russian authorities, and is no longer part of the concession territory.

=== Värska–Ulitina road ===
The road from Värska to Ulitina in Estonia, traditionally the only road to the Ulitina area, goes through Russian territory for one kilometre (0.6 mi) of its length, an area called Saatse Boot. This road has no border control, but there is no connection to any other road in Russia. It is not permissible to stop or walk along the road. This area is a part of Russia but is also a de facto part of the Schengen area.

=== Switzerland ===
Some roads, railways and tram lines along the border of Switzerland allow transit between two Swiss places through neighbouring countries, or between the border and international airports and railway stations, without customs controls (and before 2008 without passport controls when those were otherwise needed at the Swiss border). See Privileged transit traffic#Switzerland.

== Non-EU countries and territories with partial EU integration ==
Special territories of some other European countries are strongly connected to the European Union. These are as follows:

- special areas of the member states of the European Free Trade Association (EFTA):
  - Norway
    - Jan Mayen
    - Svalbard: not part of the Schengen area, Norwegian VAT area or the EU single market; free movement of people into the territory regardless of nationality
    - Bouvet Island
    - Peter I Island and Queen Maud Land are disputed Norwegian territories embodying the Norwegian claims to Antarctica but have no permanent population.
  - Switzerland
    - Samnaun and Val Sampuoir: outside Swiss VAT area
    - Basel Badischer Bahnhof platforms: part of EU Customs Union, VAT area and single market
- the United Kingdom is not a member state of the EU anymore, nevertheless, it has remained an associated country of the Euratom and is set to continue as participant in the EU's Joint European Torus and Fusion for Energy joint undertakings, as well as participant in the Euratom Supply Agency, the European Institute of Innovation and Technology and the executive agencies of the EU, while some of its territories and the Crown Dependencies are to remain partially integrated with the EU:
  - Northern Ireland remains under the Northern Ireland Protocol of the Brexit withdrawal agreement de facto part of the European Single Market and the European Union Customs Union for the purposes of goods only, in order to prevent the creation of a customs border on the island of Ireland; along with the remainder of the United Kingdom, the Crown Dependencies and the Republic of Ireland, it has continued to form the Common Travel Area outside of the Schengen Area.
  - Akrotiri and Dhekelia, a British territory, is partially integrated with Cyprus in the areas of agriculture, currency, customs, indirect taxation, social security and border control.
  - Gibraltar, also a British territory, is in negotiations with the EU for an arrangement to participate in the Schengen Area and (with exceptions) the Single Market, pending implementation.

== Summary ==
=== Special territories of EU member states ===
This table summarises the various components of EU laws applied in the special territories of EU member states.

Member states and territories	Application of EU law	EURATOM	EU citizenship	EU elections	Schengen area	EU VAT area	EU customs territory	EU single market	Eurozone
Cyprus, except:	Yes	Yes	Yes	Yes	Set to implement later (Note: Akrotiri and Dhekelia, and Cyprus should implement together the Schengen area.)	Yes	Yes	Yes	Yes
(United Nations) UN Buffer Zone	With exemptions	de facto	Yes	No	No	No	Yes (Note: Exceptions may be in place for Turkish goods and services destined for Pyla.)	With exemptions (Note: Due to the military nature of zone, the UN requires permits for some economic activity to ensure that the fundamental nature of the area as a buffer zone is not compromised.)	Yes
Northern Cyprus	Suspended	No	Cypriot citizens (Note: Cypriot nationality law extends to Northern Cyprus, meaning citizens of the Republic of Cyprus residing in Northern Cyprus are entitled to EU citizenship.)	No	No	No	No	No	TRY
Denmark, except:	Yes (Note: Opt-outs in force for some treaty provisions and legislations)	Yes	Yes	Yes	Yes	Yes	Yes	Yes	DKK (ERM II)
Greenland	Minimal (OCT)	No	Yes	No	No	No	No	Partial	DKK (ERM II)
Faroe Islands	No	No	No	No	No	No	No	Minimal (FTA)	DKK (ERM II)
Finland, except:	Yes	Yes	Yes	Yes	Yes	Yes	Yes	Yes	Yes
Åland Islands	With exemptions	Yes	Yes	Yes	Yes	No	Yes	With exemptions	Yes
France, except:	Yes	Yes	Yes	Yes	Yes	Yes	Yes	Yes	Yes
French Guiana	With exemptions (OMR)	Yes	Yes	Yes (Note: Part of the former Outre-Mer electoral constituency, now part of the single national constituency.)	No	VAT free	Yes	Yes	Yes
Guadeloupe	With exemptions (OMR)	Yes	Yes	Yes	No	Low-rate VAT	Yes	Yes	Yes
Martinique	With exemptions (OMR)	Yes	Yes	Yes	No	Low-rate VAT	Yes	Yes	Yes
Réunion	With exemptions (OMR)	Yes	Yes	Yes	No	Low-rate VAT	Yes	Yes	Yes
Mayotte	With exemptions (OMR)	Yes	Yes	Yes	No	VAT free	Yes	Yes	Yes
Saint Martin	With exemptions (OMR)	Yes	Yes	Yes	No	Low-rate VAT	Yes	Yes	Yes
Saint Barthélemy	Minimal (OCT)	Yes	Yes	Yes	No	No	No	Partial	Yes
Saint Pierre and Miquelon	Minimal (OCT)	Yes	Yes	Yes	No	No	No	Partial	Yes
Wallis and Futuna	Minimal (OCT)	Yes	Yes	Yes	No	No	No	Partial	XPF, pegged to EUR
French Polynesia	Minimal (OCT)	Yes	Yes	Yes	No	No	No	Partial	XPF, pegged to EUR
New Caledonia	Minimal (OCT)	Yes	Yes	Yes	No	No	No	Partial	XPF, pegged to EUR
French Southern and Antarctic Lands	Minimal (OCT)	Yes	Yes	No (Note: No permanent population; not part of any of the eight former European Parliament electoral constituencies of France.)	No	No	No	Partial	Yes
Clipperton Island	de facto	Yes	Yes	No	No	de facto	de facto	de facto	Yes
Germany, except:	Yes	Yes	Yes	Yes	Yes	Yes	Yes	Yes	Yes
Büsingen am Hochrhein	Yes	Yes	Yes	Yes	Yes (Note: Participating together with Switzerland)	Low-rate VAT	No	Yes	Yes
Heligoland	Yes	Yes	Yes	Yes	Yes	VAT free	No	Yes	Yes
Greece, except:	Yes	Yes	Yes	Yes	Yes	Yes	Yes	Yes	Yes
Mount Athos	Yes	Yes	Yes	Yes	Yes	VAT free	Yes	Yes	Yes
Italy, except:	Yes	Yes	Yes	Yes	Yes	Yes	Yes	Yes	Yes
Livigno	Yes	Yes	Yes	Yes	Yes	VAT free	No	Yes	Yes
Campione d'Italia	Yes	Yes	Yes	Yes	Yes	Low-rate VAT	Yes	Yes	Yes
Netherlands, except:	Yes	Yes	Yes	Yes	Yes	Yes	Yes	Yes	Yes
Bonaire	Minimal (OCT)	No (Note: Bonaire, Saba, and Sint Eustatius: Inherited status as non-member from the Netherlands Antilles.)	Yes	Yes	No	No	No	Partial	USD
Saba	Minimal (OCT)	No	Yes	Yes	No	No	No	Partial	USD
Sint Eustatius	Minimal (OCT)	No	Yes	Yes	No	No	No	Partial	USD
Curaçao	Minimal (OCT)	No	Yes (Note: Voters from the territory, like Dutch citizens residing abroad, must register with the municipality of the Hague. A separate vote count is not available.)	Yes	No	No	No	Partial	XCG
Sint Maarten	Minimal (OCT)	No	Yes	Yes	No	No	No	Partial	XCG
Aruba	Minimal (OCT)	de facto	Yes	Yes	No	No	No	Partial	AWG
Portugal, except:	Yes	Yes	Yes	Yes	Yes	Yes	Yes	Yes	Yes
Azores	Yes (OMR)	Yes	Yes	Yes	Yes	Local rate	Yes	Yes	Yes
Madeira	Yes (OMR)	Yes	Yes	Yes	Yes	Local rate	Yes	Yes	Yes
Spain, except:	Yes	Yes	Yes	Yes	Yes	Yes	Yes	Yes	Yes
Canary Islands	With exemptions (OMR)	Yes	Yes	Yes	Yes	VAT free	Yes	Yes	Yes
Ceuta	With exemptions	Yes	Yes	Yes	Partial (Note: The full Schengen acquis applies to all Spanish territories, but there are border checks on departure from Ceuta and Melilla to Spain or other Schengen countries, because of specific arrangements for visa exemptions for Moroccan nationals resident in the provinces of Tetuan and Nador.)	VAT free	No	Yes	Yes
Melilla	With exemptions	Yes	Yes	Yes	Partial	VAT free	No	Yes	Yes
Member states and territories	Application of EU law	EURATOM	EU citizenship	EU elections	Schengen area	EU VAT area	EU customs territory	EU single market	Eurozone
Legend for the "Application of EU law" column: Full. Part of the EU. — Minimal or none. Not part of the EU territory.

=== Special territories of other European states ===
Special territories of EFTA states and some other European countries also have a special status in regard to EU laws applied.

Countries and territories	Application of EU law	EURATOM	Schengen area	EU VAT area	EU customs territory	EU single market	Adoption of euro
Norway, except:	Partial	No	Yes	No	No	With exemptions, in EEA	NOK
Svalbard	Partial	No	No	VAT free	No	No	NOK
Jan Mayen	Partial	No	Yes	VAT free	No	Like rest of Norway	NOK
Bouvet Island	No	No	No	No	No	No	NOK
Peter I Island	No	No	No	No	No	No	NOK
Queen Maud Land	No	No	No	No	No	No	NOK
Switzerland, except:	Partial	Associated state	Yes	Swiss–Liechtenstein VAT area	Swiss–Liechtenstein customs territory	With exemptions, not in EEA	CHF
Samnaun and Val Sampuoir	Partial	Associated state	Yes	VAT free	Swiss–Liechtenstein customs territory	With exemptions, not in EEA	CHF
Basel Badischer Bahnhof platforms	Partial	Associated state	Yes	Yes	Yes	Yes	CHF
United Kingdom, except:	Partial	Associated state	CTA	No	No	No	GBP
Northern Ireland	Partial (Note: The Northern Ireland Protocol applies EU law only to the extent necessary to prevent a customs border between Northern Ireland and the Republic of Ireland)	Associated state	CTA	Goods only, de facto	Goods only, de facto	Goods only, de facto	GBP
(United Kingdom) Akrotiri and Dhekelia	Partial	Associated state	Set to implement later	Yes	Yes	Partial (Note: In a declaration attached to the Treaty of Establishment of the Republic of Cyprus of 1960, the British government undertook not to allow new settlement of people in the sovereign base areas other than for temporary purposes, meaning at present, free movement of people is limited.)	Yes
Gibraltar	Partial	Associated state	Set to implement later	No	Set to implement later	Partial	GIP
Guernsey	Partial	Associated state	CTA	No	No	No	GGP
Jersey	Partial	Associated state	CTA	No	No	No	JEP
Isle of Man	Partial	Associated state	CTA	No	No	No	IMP
Other (United Kingdom) British Overseas Territories	No	Associated state	No	No	No	No	Various currencies
Countries and territories	Application of EU law	EURATOM	Schengen area	EU VAT area	EU customs territory	EU single market	Adoption of euro

== Former special territories ==
Many currently independent states or parts of such were previously territories of the following EU members since the latter joined the EU or, previously the European Coal and Steel Community (ECSC):

- Belgium (with multiple territories, from ECSC formation until 1962)
- France (with multiple territories, from ECSC formation)
- Italy (with Italian Somaliland, from ECSC formation until 1960)
- The Netherlands (with multiple territories, from ECSC formation)
- Portugal (with multiple territories, from 1986 enlargement until 1999 (de facto)/2002 (de jure))
- United Kingdom (with multiple territories, from 1973 enlargement)

Most of these territories seceded before the implementation of the Maastricht Treaty in 1993 and the following years, meaning that cooperation like the EU citizenship, the VAT union or the Eurozone did not exist, so it made less difference to be a special territory then.

These were:

- Cambodia (gained independence from France in 1953), no Community treaty applied there, besides ECSC preferences
- Laos (gained independence from France in 1954), no Community treaty applied there, besides ECSC preferences
- Vietnam (gained independence from France in 1954), no Community treaty applied there, besides ECSC preferences
- Tunisia (gained independence from France in 1956), no Community treaty applied there, besides ECSC preferences
- Morocco (gained independence from France in 1956), no Community treaty applied there, besides ECSC preferences
- Guinea (gained independence from France in 1958), had OCT status
- Cameroon (French-administered part gained independence from France in 1960 along with some of UK-administered parts); had OCT status for the French part
- Togo (gained independence from France in 1960), had OCT status
- Mali (gained independence from France in 1960), had OCT status
- Senegal (gained independence from France in 1960), had OCT status
- Madagascar (gained independence from France in 1960), had OCT status
- DR Congo (gained independence from Belgium in 1960), had OCT status
- Somalia (Italian-administered part gained independence from Italy in 1960 along with UK-administered part); had OCT status for the Italian part
- Benin (gained independence from France in 1960), had OCT status
- Niger (gained independence from France in 1960), had OCT status
- Burkina Faso (gained independence from France in 1960), had OCT status
- Ivory Coast (gained independence from France in 1960), had OCT status
- Chad (gained independence from France in 1960), had OCT status
- Central African Republic (gained independence from France in 1960), had OCT status
- Congo (gained independence from France in 1960), had OCT status
- Gabon (gained independence from France in 1960), had OCT status
- Mauritania (gained independence from France in 1960), had OCT status
- Burundi (gained independence from Belgium in 1962), had OCT status
- Rwanda (gained independence from Belgium in 1962), had OCT status
- Netherlands New Guinea (transferred from the Netherlands to UN in 1962, later annexed by Indonesia), had OCT status
- Suriname (gained independence from the Netherlands in 1975), had OCT status, EURATOM application unsure.
- Algeria (gained independence from France in 1962), had a status similar to OMR
- The Bahamas (gained independence from the UK in 1973), had OCT status
- Grenada (gained independence from the UK in 1973), had OCT status
- Comoros (gained independence from France in 1975), had OCT status
- Seychelles (gained independence from the UK in 1976), had OCT status
- French Somaliland (gained independence from France as Djibouti in 1977), had OCT status
- Solomon Islands (gained independence from the UK in 1978), had OCT status
- Tuvalu (gained independence from the UK in 1978), had OCT status
- Dominica (gained independence from the UK in 1978), had OCT status
- Saint Lucia (gained independence from the UK in 1979), had OCT status
- Kiribati (gained independence from the UK in 1979), had OCT status
- Saint Vincent and the Grenadines (gained independence from the UK in 1979), had OCT status
- Zimbabwe (gained de jure independence from the UK in 1980), no Community treaty applied there, besides ECSC preferences
- Vanuatu (gained independence from the UK and France in 1980), generally had OCT status
- Belize (gained independence from the UK in 1981), had OCT status
- Antigua and Barbuda (gained independence from the UK in 1981), had OCT status
- Saint Kitts and Nevis (gained independence from the UK in 1983), had OCT status
- Brunei (gained independence from UK in 1984), had OCT status
- Hong Kong (sovereignty transferred from the UK to China in 1997), no Community treaty applied there, besides ECSC preferences
- Macau (sovereignty transferred from Portugal to China in 1999), EURATOM was applicable, besides the ECSC preferences
- Timor-Leste (East Timor) (gained independence from Indonesia in 2002, considered under Portuguese administration before that), no Community treaty applied there (Note: When Portugal became a Community member in 1986 East Timor was considered a non-self-governing-territory under Portuguese administration by the United Nations despite Indonesian occupation of East Timor between 1975 and 1999. None of the EC laws were ever in force, but EURATOM and ECSC preferences were to apply if not for the Indonesian occupation. The de jure Portuguese administration formally ceased on 20 May 2002 when Portugal recognised East Timor's independence.)

The United Kingdom left the EU in 2020. When it was a member, some of its Crown Dependencies and Overseas Territories were partially integrated with the EU.

- Gibraltar was part of the EU and partially inside its single market.
- Jersey, Guernsey and the Isle of Man were not part of the EU, but were in its customs union and enjoyed free trade.
- Akrotiri and Dhekelia continue to have partial integration with Cyprus, an EU member state, even after the UK is no longer an EU member.
- Other territories which were Overseas Territories that year had OCT status.

Additionally in Europe there were special territories in the past that had different status than their "mainland", because of various reasons, but now are part of a member state. Some of these territories were as follows:

- The Austrian areas of Kleinwalsertal and Jungholz formerly enjoyed a special legal status. The two areas have road access only to Germany and none directly to other parts of Austria. They were de facto in a customs and currency union with Germany and there were no border controls between Kleinwalsertal and Jungholz, respectively, and Germany. When Austria entered the EU (and its customs union) in 1995, the customs union became defunct. The entry into force of the Schengen Agreement for Austria (1997) and the introduction of the euro (2002) caused Kleinwalsertal and Jungholz to lose their remaining legal privileges now being legally treated in the same manner as the rest of Austria.
- Saar (merged with the Federal Republic of Germany on 1 January 1957), was fully part of the Community as French-administered European territory
- West Berlin (merged with the Federal Republic of Germany on 3 October 1990), was subject to the full application of the treaties (Note: Until the unification of Germany in 1990 the de jure status of West Berlin was that of French, UK and US occupied zones with West German civilian administration. The treaties applied fully during 1952–1990 given the Federal German and French treaty responsibilities European Coal and Steel Community Treaty, Art.79, and during 1973–1990 given the British treaty responsibilities. For the 1979, 1984 and 1989 European Parliaments, three MEPs were appointed on the nomination of the Berlin House of Representatives rather than being directly elected. From 3 October 1990 West Berlin was fully integrated in Berlin in the Federal Republic of Germany, along with the former East Germany.)
- German Democratic Republic (East Germany) was until 1972 on paper a part of one Germany and the European Community, since West Germany, the NATO countries and the European Community did not recognize the German Democratic Republic (East Germany) until 1972. East Germany did not recognize any membership of the EC. The West German government treated trade with East Germany as inter-German trade and not subject to the EC trade tariffs.

The following areas are still special member state territories, but have changed their status. See their entries in the article for details.

- Greenland
- Saint Barthélemy
- Mayotte

== See also ==
- Dependent territory
- Elections to the European Parliament
- Enlargement of the European Union
- European Union Association Agreement
- European Union law
- Eurosphere
- Eurozone
- Foreign relations of the European Union
- Freedom of movement for workers in the European Union
- Free economic zone – Geographic area where economic activity between and within countries is less regulated
- Future enlargement of the European Union
- History of the European Union
- Member state of the European Union
- Microstates and the European Union
- Opt-outs in the European Union
- Outline of the European Union
- Withdrawal from the European Union
