= Convention on the association of the Netherlands Antilles with the European Economic Community =

International agreement

Convention amending the Treaty establishing the European Economic Community, with a view to making applicable to the Netherlands Antilles the special regime of association defined in part IV of the said Treaty
- Type: Amends the Treaty establishing the European Economic Community
- Signed: 13 November 1962
- Location: Brussels, Belgium
- Effective: 1 October 1964
- Signatories: The Six
- Depositary: Government of Italy
- Languages: Dutch, French, German, Italian

Full text
- Convention amending the Treaty establishing the European Economic Community, with a view to making applicable to the Netherlands Antilles the special regime of association defined in part IV of the said Treaty at Wikisource

The Convention on the association of the Netherlands Antilles with the European Economic Community is an international agreement amending the Treaty establishing the European Economic Community, with the aim of awarding OCT status to the Netherlands Antilles, which was a constituent country of the Kingdom of the Netherlands from 1954 until 2010. A full treaty revision was needed because Belgium, France, Germany, Italy, and Luxembourg wanted to add a protocol on the import of refined petroleum products from the Netherlands Antilles.

== Background ==
Because the Charter for the Kingdom of the Netherlands, proclaimed in 1954, instituted a Kingdom in which the three parties—the Netherlands, the Netherlands Antilles, and Suriname—participated on basis of equality, the Netherlands in 1957 only negotiated the Treaties of Rome on behalf of itself. A special protocol attached to both the Treaty establishing the European Economic Community and the Treaty establishing the European Atomic Economic Energy Community specifically declared that the Kingdom was entitled to ratify the treaties for the Netherlands and Netherlands New Guinea only, or for the Kingdom as a whole. Both treaties were indeed subsequently ratified for the Netherlands and Netherlands New Guinea only. A Declaration of Intent on the association of Surinam and the Netherlands Antilles with the European Economic Community, however, was attached to the Final Act of the Intergovernmental Conference for the Common Market and EURATOM:

The governments of the Kingdom of Belgium, the Federal Republic of Germany, the French Republic, the Italian Republic, the Grand Duchy of Luxembourg and the Kingdom of the Netherlands,

Taking into consideration the close ties which unite the several parts of the Kingdom of the Netherlands,

Anxious to maintain and intensify the traditional trade flows between the Member States of the European Economic Community on the one hand and Surinam and the Netherlands Antilles on the other, and to contribute to the economic and social development of these countries,

Declare their readiness, as soon as this Treaty enters into force, to open negotiations at the request of the Kingdom of the Netherlands, with a view to concluding conventions for the economic association of Surinam and the Netherlands Antilles with the Community.

Suriname became already associated with the European Economic Community on 1 September 1962, by virtue of a Supplementary Act completing the instrument of ratification of the Kingdom of the Netherlands. This was possible, because the protocol attached to the EEC Treaty did not oblige the Kingdom of the Netherlands to only ratify on behalf of the Netherlands and Netherlands New Guinea, but rather established that it was entitled to do so. Applying the treaty to the Netherlands Antilles by Supplementary Act to the instrument of ratification turned out to be an impossibility, as the other five Member States of the Community wanted some safeguards with regard to the import of petroleum products refined in the islands, and thus a full treaty revision according to Article 236 of the EEC Treaty had to be negotiated.

== Amendments ==
The Kingdom of the Netherlands proposed a treaty revision on 4 June 1962. This proposal was met with favourable responses from the Commission, the Assembly, and the Council on 10 September, 19 October, and 22 October, respectively. An Intergovernmental Conference was convened on 13 November, which signed the convention.

The actual Convention consists of four articles, the first of which establishes that the Netherlands Antilles shall be added to the list in Annex IV of the Treaty establishing the European Economic Community (now Annex II). Article 2 adds another protocol to the EEC Treaty, named Protocol concerning imports into the European Economic Community of petroleum products refined in the Netherlands Antilles. Article 3 concerns the ratification and article 4 the authentic versions of the text.

== Ratification ==
The treaty entered into force on 1 October 1964, the first day of the month following the date of deposit of the last instrument of ratification by a signatory state, in this case Italy:

Signatory	Date of deposit of the instrument of ratification
Netherlands	2 July 1963
France	10 January 1964
Belgium	12 March 1964
Luxembourg	22 March 1964
Germany	21 April 1964
Italy	14 September 1964
