= Withdrawal of Greenland from the European Communities =

Greenland leaving the EC, precursor to the EU

Greenland Treaty
Treaty amending, with regard to Greenland, the Treaties establishing the European Communities
- Signed: 13 March 1984
- Location: Brussels
- Effective: 1 February 1985
- Signatories: 10
- Depositary: Government of the Italian Republic
- Languages: All 8 official Languages of the European Communities

Full text
- Greenland Treaty at Wikisource

The changing membership of the EU. Greenland is the large island at top left.

After being a part of the European Communities (EC) for twelve years, Greenland withdrew in 1985. It had joined the EC in 1973 as a county of Denmark, even though a majority in Greenland was against joining. In a consultative referendum in 1982, 53% of the electorate of Greenland voted to withdraw from the Communities. This latter referendum became possible after the introduction of home rule in Greenland in 1979. Following its withdrawal, which was regulated through the Greenland Treaty, the relationship between Greenland and the EC was partly settled through an association under Overseas Countries and territories (OCT) status. Since Brexit, the Greenlandic withdrawal from the European Communities has retrospectively been referred to as "Greenxit".

== Greenland's accession process to the European Communities ==
=== Greenland – Denmark relations after the abolition of its colonial status in 1953 ===
Greenland's colonial status from Denmark officially ended in 1953 through an amendment of the Danish Constitution. Subsequently, Greenland was integrated as a county in the Realm of Denmark and thus became an integral part of the Kingdom of Denmark. This status granted Greenlanders the Danish citizenship. At the same time, despite the official end of colonialism, Denmark continued to follow a policy of cultural assimilation including discriminatory practices towards Greenlanders. A prominent example is the ‘birthplace criterion’, which granted non-Greenlandic, but Danish workers higher salaries than local Greenlandic workers. The loss of the traditional culture of Greenland together with the growing dissatisfaction of mainly young Greenlanders ultimately played a decisive role when it came to the question of Greenland's independence movement, both from Denmark and the European Communities.

In the years following its decolonization, Greenland's economy continued to be very dependent on the fishing sector. Denmark was directly involved in the establishment of a real fishing industry including manufacturing of fishing products. Despite various attempts, other sectors of the economy did not develop much during that time.

As the County of Greenland within Metropolitan Denmark, before it gained autonomy within the Kingdom of Denmark in 1979, Greenland's foreign relations and governance of the island remained under control of Metropolitan Danish institutions.

=== Accession negotiations of Denmark to become a member of the European Communities ===
Denmark formally submitted its application to join the European Communities, on 10 August 1961. As a Constituency of Denmark, Greenland was fully integrated in the Danish accession process. When negotiating its accession, the Danish government managed to secure a number of concessions and special conditions for Greenland. These included amongst other provisions a transition period of ten years in order to protect the fishing industry of Greenland. In addition, these concessions directly referred to subject areas that were considered sensitive or problematic for Greenland. On the one hand, Denmark was granted the possibility to restrict the right of establishment in Greenland and on the other hand Greenland received exceptions with regards to fisheries. However, even though Greenlandic fisherman were allocated a fairly high quota corresponding to their actual fishing capacity, there was a strong discontentment with the fishing quotas that were allocated to fishermen from other EC countries, such as Germany. This later developed into one of the main reasons for Greenland's withdrawal from the community.

=== Danish referendum on the accession to the European Communities 1972 ===
On 2 October 1972, the Danish government submitted the question of accession to the European Communities to its electorate. The inhabitants of Greenland were also called to the polls.

While at Danish national level, 63.5% of the voters voted in favour of joining the Communities, in Greenland, however, the referendum resulted in a clear rejection of the EC by 70.8% of the voters. The clear rejection of the EC membership by the voters of Greenland was not only interpreted as a clear voice against the European Communities, but also as a strong rejection of the dominance of any foreign power. Nevertheless, despite the clear rejection in Greenland, the island joined the European Communities as part of Denmark on 1 January 1973.

In this regard, the Greenlandic case differed from the Faroe Islands. The Faroe Islands attained home rule status in 1948, which, according to Danish legislation, allowed them not to be part of the Danish vote on the EC question. The Faroe Islands wished to stay outside the European Communities and, thus, never joined them.

=== Entry of Greenland into the European Communities in 1973 ===
Denmark's accession to the European Communities on 1 January 1973 also entailed the access to Community funds, which were substantial for Greenland. In addition to investments in infrastructure projects, a considerable amount of Community funding including from the European Investment Bank went into areas unrelated to fisheries, such as education, enterprises or projects in the field of energy resources. In comparison with other EC regions in need, Greenland received by large the biggest amount per capita, of which some of the amounts were compensation for EC fishing rights in Greenland waters and loans.

Finally, with its accession to the Communities, Denmark reserved one of its seats in the European Parliament to a person from Greenland, and allowed an observer from Greenland to accompany the Danish Council member.

Despite these concessions and positive rights granted to Greenland, there remained a strong opposition in Greenland against the EC membership. It was characterized by a sentiment that its entry into the European Communities was forced by a majority of Danish voters and at the same time by a strong reluctance vis-à-vis the Community due to its fishery policy and general perception of the EC being too far away and not attentive towards Greenland's concerns and desires.

== Developments towards a second referendum on the European Communities ==
=== Political developments in Greenland since its accession to the European Communities in 1973 ===
Until the 1970s Greenland was solely governed by the Danish state. The decolonization process was administered through top-down decisions, which were agreed in the capital and implemented in Greenland by a small Danish bourgeoisie. The Danish State retained control over economic as well as social policy questions. It was only in the 1970s, that a real Greenlandic young elite arose. This elite, frustrated about the Danish domination, was at the same time critical and outspoken against the Danish governance, and gradually took up political leadership. During this period, an increased ethnic consciousness on the one hand and a political awareness of their country on the other hand emerged among the Greenlanders. This led to a political awakening through which the Greenlandic population became more determined about shaping the future of their own society.

The first EC referendum in 1972 constituted a key moment and turning point in the political history of Greenland. As a reaction towards the strongly voiced criticism over the Danish dominance, a Home-Rule Committee consisting of only Greenlandic members was set up in 1973 with the mission to propose preliminary guidelines for a possible system of home rule for Greenland. The concrete formulation of a home rule system was subsequently addressed by a Danish-Greenland Home-Rule Commission in 1975.

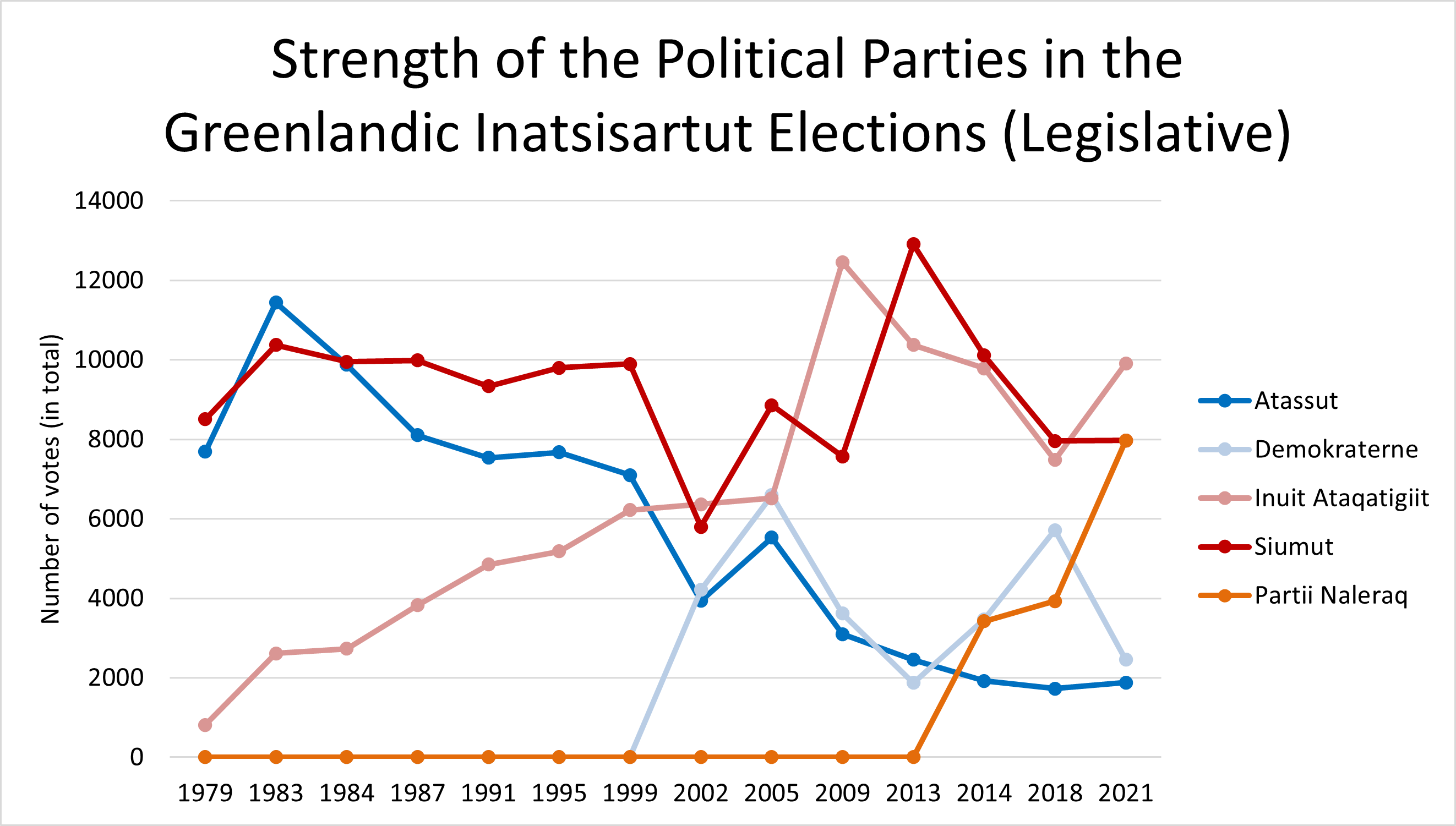
Results of the Greenlandic Inatsisartut / Parliamentary Elections (1979-2021) illustrating the strength of the political parties reaching at least 1500 votes. The red and orange-coloured parties campaigned in the 1970s and 1980s for Greenland to leave the European Community. The blue-coloured parties argued for remaining in the EC.

These political developments in the early 1970s also resulted in the creation of the first political parties in Greenland. Within a short time, a diverse party landscape has emerged. The Siumut party (meaning "Forward") was the first and since the very beginning most powerful party. Founded in 1975, it strongly advocated for self-governance, the introduction of home rule and the withdrawal from the European Communities. The second party to enter the political scene shortly thereafter was Atassut ("the Connecting Link"), which also favoured home rule for Greenland but opted for a unified approach towards Denmark and preferred to maintain the status quo, i.e. to remain in the Kingdom of Denmark. The third, but by far smallest political party at that time, was Inuit Ataqatigiit ("Human/Inuit Brotherhood"). It followed the most radical line of national self-determination and called for complete independence on Greenland.

Ultimately, on 17 January 1979, the Home Rule Act was submitted to Greenlandic voters and adopted with a majority of 70.1% of the votes cast. Home rule, which was consequently introduced on 1 May 1979, set the basis for the future autonomy of Greenland over most topics including economic and social development as well as the establishment of own political structures including the Inatsisartut, a legislative assembly, and the Naalakkersuisut, a home rule government. At the first elections of the Inatsisartut and Naalakkersuisut in 1979, Siumut won a majority in both the legislative and executive of Greenland.

While home rule implied that Greenland still remained part of the Danish Kingdom, it gave the right to Greenland to renegotiate its relationship with the European Communities.

=== Call and campaign for a second referendum on the European Communities ===
The introduction of Home Rule in 1979, the rise of Siumut as the dominating party of Greenland following an anti-EC narrative, as well as the imminent end of the 10 years transition period as EC member gave a new impetus to the question over Greenland's remaining or possible withdrawal from the European Communities. In Spring 1981, the Greenlandic Inatsisartut unanimously agreed to hold a second, consultative referendum on the Community question in February 1982.

For Siumut, which strongly campaigned in favour of withdrawing from the EC, exit was seen as a natural and important first step after the introduction of home rule for Greenland to shape its future. Siumut was supported by Inuit Ataqatigiit. Both argued that the EC membership constituted a threat to Greenland's political and cultural identity and they demanded that control over the Greenlandic fishing industry be regained from the EC bodies.

Atassut on the other hand also called for an end of the exploitation of Greenland's fisheries by the European Communities, but was against Greenland leaving the EC. The party suggested to renegotiate with the Community its membership provisions on fishing and argued that only a close cooperation with the countries of the European Communities allows Greenland to successfully complete its process of modernization. Atassut strongly emphasized in its arguments for remain the financial losses a withdrawal from the European Communities would bring about, as this would ultimately end the large EC funding.

Overall, the campaign surrounding the second EC referendum in 1981 and early 1982 was not only lengthy and expensive, but also unusually harsh and bitter by Greenlandic standards, which was echoed in an atmosphere of anger and disappointment among Greenlanders. The arguments used by both supporters and opponents were mainly economic. The leavers called for an independent fisheries policy, whereas the remainers recalled the importance of the EC funding for the development of the Greenlandic economy.

== Referendum vote of 23 February 1982 ==
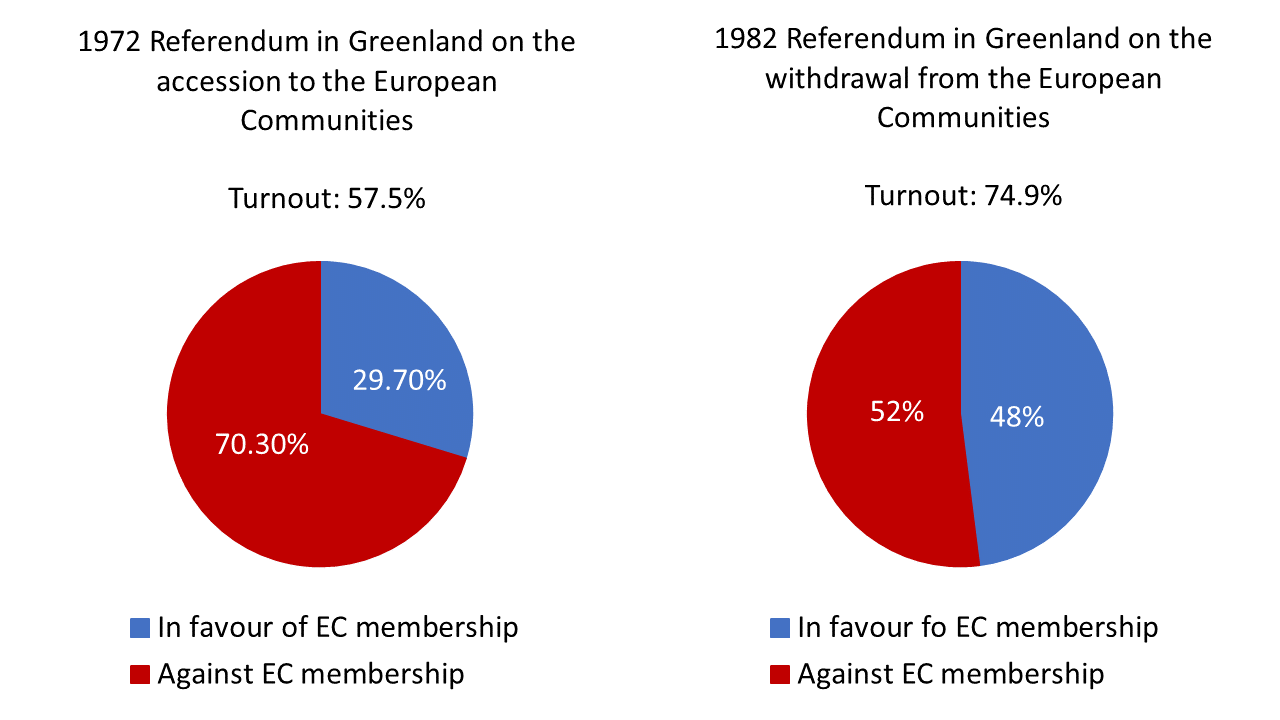
Results of the 1972 and 1982 referendums in Greenland on membership in the European Communities and voter turnout

The referendum on Greenland's staying in or withdrawal from the European Communities took place on 23 February 1982. Although under the Danish Constitution only a consultative referendum was possible, the Danish government made it clear before the referendum that they would accept a withdrawal vote as a binding negotiating mandate vis-à-vis the EC.

At this second EC referendum within ten years, 52% of the Greenlandic electorate voted for a withdrawal from the European Communities. The turnout at this vote cast was historically high with 74.9%.

Various reasons were put forward after the vote to explain the result. First and foremost, the general aversion of the population to the EC played a crucial role. The EC was seen as a far-away, supranational institution, which not only showed little consideration of Greenland's interests but in some instances actively overruled them - giving echoes of colonial times. Other causes put forward include the sensitivity among the Greenlandic population over issues concerning fisheries and the independent control over their raw materials, which were both considered to be threatened by the EC membership. Finally, the introduction of home rule less than three years before the referendum, and linked to this the increased perception of political ownership in Greenland, are additional reasons which can explain the outcome of the 1982 vote.

However, as compared to the 1972 referendum, the results of the 1982 vote show that despite these factors, the popularity of the European Communities had nonetheless risen considerably in the 10 years of membership. While in 1972 more than 70% were against EC membership, in 1982 the majority shrank to 52%.

Overall, according to scholars such as Johanson and Lehmann Sørensen, the outcome of the referendum revealed that Greenlanders were ready to pay the price of withdrawal, which not only implied the loss of the financial support coming from the Communities as a member, but in the long run might also result in a "slower pace of development".

In reaction to the 1982 referendum result, the Danish government declared its full support in the negotiations over Greenland's withdrawal. However, it also made clear that the Danish treasury would not give any kind of compensation payments for the loss of EC subsidies.

== Withdrawal process and the Greenland Treaty of 1984 ==
=== Preparation of the withdrawal negotiations ahead of the 1982 referendum ===
Already one year before the referendum vote on a possible Greenlandic withdrawal from the European Communities, the question of the options for future EU-Greenland relations was discussed in Greenland. The options on the table included on the one hand a status similar to that of the Faroe Islands and on the other hand OCT status. OCT status was a special arrangement, created under the Rome Treaty (Articles 131–136) in 1957 for overseas countries and territories of EC member states. In August 1981, the government of Greenland, the Naalakkersuisut, declared that it would opt for an OCT status. This guaranteed a "certain degree of economic integration into the common market" and most importantly "tariff-free access to the Common Market for export of fish and fish products". Additionally, through the OCT status the territories and countries concerned could benefit from the special financial aids and loans granted through the European Development Fund and the European Investment Bank. Overall, in terms of capital and trade, the OCT status was thus considered more advantageous for Greenland than Faroe Status.

=== Withdrawal negotiations ===
Since the Danish government had already declared before the Greenland referendum that it would accept the result as a definitive outcome, the Greenlandic government's request to launch its EC withdrawal negotiations was mainly a formality. However, on the basis of the EC treaties, it was still the Government of Denmark which was officially leading the negotiations for the withdrawal and not the Greenlandic government itself. In May 1982, the Danish government submitted to the Council a proposal in form of a draft treaty which was envisaged to amend the Rome Treaty in order for Greenland to exit the Communities and to obtain OCT status. However, it is important to emphasize that at that time there was no treaty provision for withdrawal from the European Communities. Without the willingness of the member states of the Community to react to the "withdrawal notice" and to engage in negotiations, the whole withdrawal process could potentially have been abandoned at that point. However, in February 1983, the Commission responded with a favourable opinion on Greenland's withdrawal from the EC and its request of OCT status "with certain specific provisions". Whereas, it is put forward that the EC "had hardly any other choice than to agree to negotiations", the position regarding future EU-Greenland relations and most particularly OCT status was not uncontroversial at the time.

When the Irish Commissioner, Richard Burke, visited a number of EC capitals in the end of 1982 and early 1983, in order to draft the Commission's opinion, he "met widespread opposition against granting favourable OCT status to a withdrawing EC member". The main arguments voiced by EC member states against a beneficial OCT status without major commitments from the side of Greenland were that this would set a precedent for regions in other member states to request home rule or even autonomy and subsequently a withdrawal from the EC. Also the European Commission was relatively reluctant to create a precedent arguing that "exit should not benefit a country voluntarily asking to leave". The Danish government's counter-argument was that "Greenland should not benefit but should also not be punished for leaving". Furthermore, it also argued that Greenland should enjoy more leeway given the vital strategic role it assumed during the Cold War by hosting US bases. Ultimately, it was recognised that the culture, geographic location, economic structure and many other features of Greenland were so distinct from other EC member states, that the 'precedent argument' did not apply.

Regarding the position of Greenland on the withdrawal negotiations, it was emphasized that EC fishermen should not have unconditional access to Greenland fishing waters, but that they had to pay for licenses. Further, but less controversial, requests concerned the rights of establishment, underground resources and "Inuit circumpolar co-operation".

=== Greenland Treaty of 1984 ===
The final revision of the treaty and thereby the withdrawal conditions for Greenland from the European Communities were decided by the Council in Brussels on 13 March 1984. The so-called "Greenland Treaty" comprised the following provisions:

Article 1	Removal of Greenland from the European Coal and Steel Community (ECSC)
Articles 2–4	Definition of Greenland as an overseas territory associated with the EEC (OCT status)
Article 5	Removal of Greenland from EURATOM
Articles 6–7	Provisions on ratification, entry into force and depository of the treaty

The Additional Protocol on special arrangements for Greenland, which was attached to the Greenland Treaty, included the following articles:

Article 1	Exemptions of Greenland from export duties regarding fishery products under certain conditions
Article 2	Transition arrangements regarding rights of establishment and financial assistance
Article 3	Adding of Greenland to the list of OCTs

Overall, the treaty allowed Greenland to keep its financial contribution and fishing rights and to enjoy tariff-free access for its fishing products to the EU, provided that a satisfactory agreement was found on fisheries. The Treaty arranged for the exit of Greenland and amended earlier treaties of the European Communities. As such, it is an integral part of the constitutional basis of the European Union.

On 13 March 1984, the ten member states of the European Communities signed the Greenland Treaty. Following the ratification of the Treaty by the national parliaments of all EC member states (except for Greece, which ratified it by a joint decision of Ministers of Foreign Affairs and National Economy and Finance) the Greenland Treaty entered into force on 1 February 1985, which also marks the formal date of withdrawal of Greenland from the European Communities.

== Potential return of Greenland to the EU ==
Three decades after Greenland's withdrawal from the European Communities, a minority of Greenlandic politicians and business leaders have suggested that a re-entry of Greenland into the European Union should be considered. This could help to diversify Greenland's economy outside the fisheries sector. However, apart from a few isolated voices, such as that of the Danish MEP Morten Løkkegaard, this proposal has not been followed through in Greenlandic politics. Greenland maintains close cooperation with the EU, but its Prime Minister Jens-Frederik Nielsen said in 2025 that it was not seeking to rejoin.

== See also ==
- Algeria–European Union relations#History (Algeria seceded from the French Republic in 1962 but its consequent status vis-à-vis the EEC was unclear until 1976.)
- Danish withdrawal from the European Union
- Greenland and the European Union
- Greenland (European Parliament constituency)
- Withdrawal from the European Union
