= Greenland and the European Union =

Diplomatic relations between the European Union and Greenland

Greenland–European Union relations
- European Union: Greenland

Greenland, an autonomous territory within the Kingdom of Denmark (which also includes the territories of metropolitan Denmark and Faroe Islands), is one of the EU members’ overseas countries and territories (OCT) associated to the European Union. Greenland receives funding from the EU for sustainable development and has signed agreements increasing cooperation with the EU.

The associated relationship with the EU also means that all citizens of the Kingdom of Denmark residing in Greenland (Greenlandic nationals) are EU citizens. Danish citizenship allows Greenlanders to move and reside freely within the EU.

Greenland joined the then European Community in 1973 with Denmark, but after gaining autonomy in 1979 with the introduction of home rule within the Kingdom of Denmark, Greenland voted to leave in 1982 and left in 1985, to become an OCT. The main reasons for leaving were disagreements about the Common Fisheries Policy and to regain control of Greenlandic fish resources, to subsequently remain outside EU waters.

== Trade ==
In 2010, Greenland's exports to the EU amounted to € 331 million (a 92.7% share of Greenland's total exports) and Greenland's imports from the EU were valued at €614 million (68.9% of all Greenland's imports). Exports to the EU were mainly food and live animals (89%). Imports from the EU included mineral fuels, lubricants (and related goods), machinery and transport equipment (together 47%). The EU is Greenland's main trading partner. However, Greenland ranks as the EU's 103rd largest trading partner.

In 2009 the EU Ban on Seal Products put in place an import ban on seal fur on grounds of animal cruelty, but made exemptions for Inuit communities in Greenland and Canada in order to protect indigenous ways of life. The ban only allows small-scale hunts for population control and local circulation – produce is not allowed to enter the EU. The ban angered those communities in the Arctic Circle who depend on sales from large scale seal hunting. Exports of seal pelts in Greenland have dropped 90% in a few years – from 60 million DKK to DKK 6 million a year since 2006.

== OCT status ==
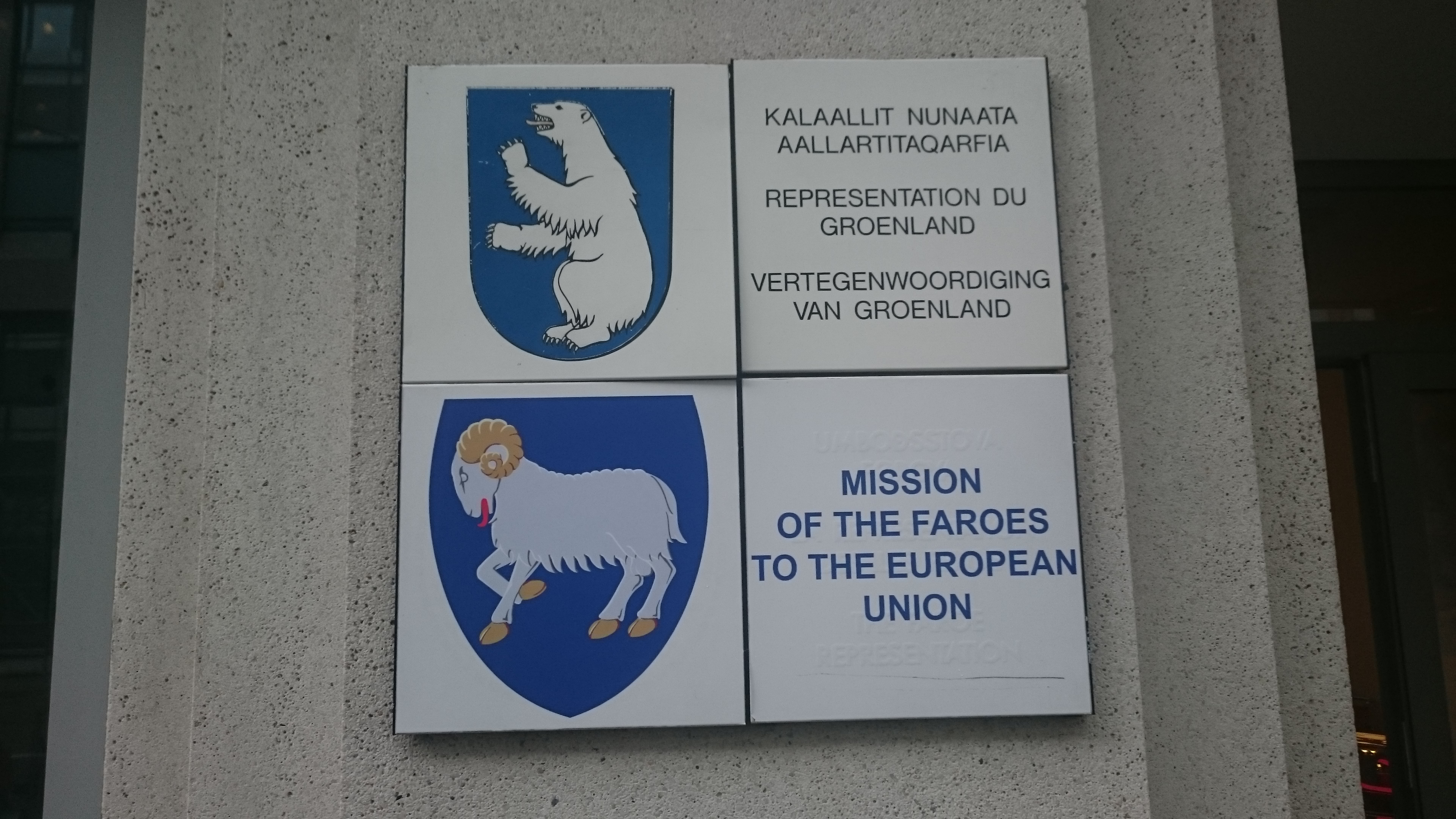
Greenland Representation to the European Union

Greenland is one of the Overseas Countries and Territories (OCT) of the EU due to its political status in Kingdom of Denmark. As a result, Greenland has some integration with the EU's internal market via association agreements. It is also within the EU's common external tariff but they may charge customs in a non-discriminatory manner. Greenlandic nationals have EU citizenship. (Note: This status is stipulated in Articles 9 TEU and 20 TFEU, which state that EU citizenship is granted to nationals of EU member states, including Denmark, regardless of the region they reside in. The special arrangements for Greenland are detailed in Protocol No. 34.) OCT nationals can be granted the right to vote for and participate in elections of the European Parliament, subject to the conditions defined by the related member states in compliance with Community law.

Up to 2006, all EU funds to Greenland (then € 42.8 million per year) went via the EU-Greenland fishing agreement. Between 2007 and 2013, the EU provided € 25 million per year outside of fishing. Greenland has been given aid since it pulled out of the EU (see below) in 1985 to roughly the same amount it was previously receiving in EU structural funds (which it lost the right to receive due to its secession). This amounted to about 7% of Greenland's budget. The amount paid via the fishing agreement was in return for EU vessels fishing in Greenland's waters and to help restructure Greenland's fishing fleet. However, this deal was struck down by the European Court of Auditors, who held that the amount the EU was paying was too high for the quantity of fish caught.

== OCTA ==
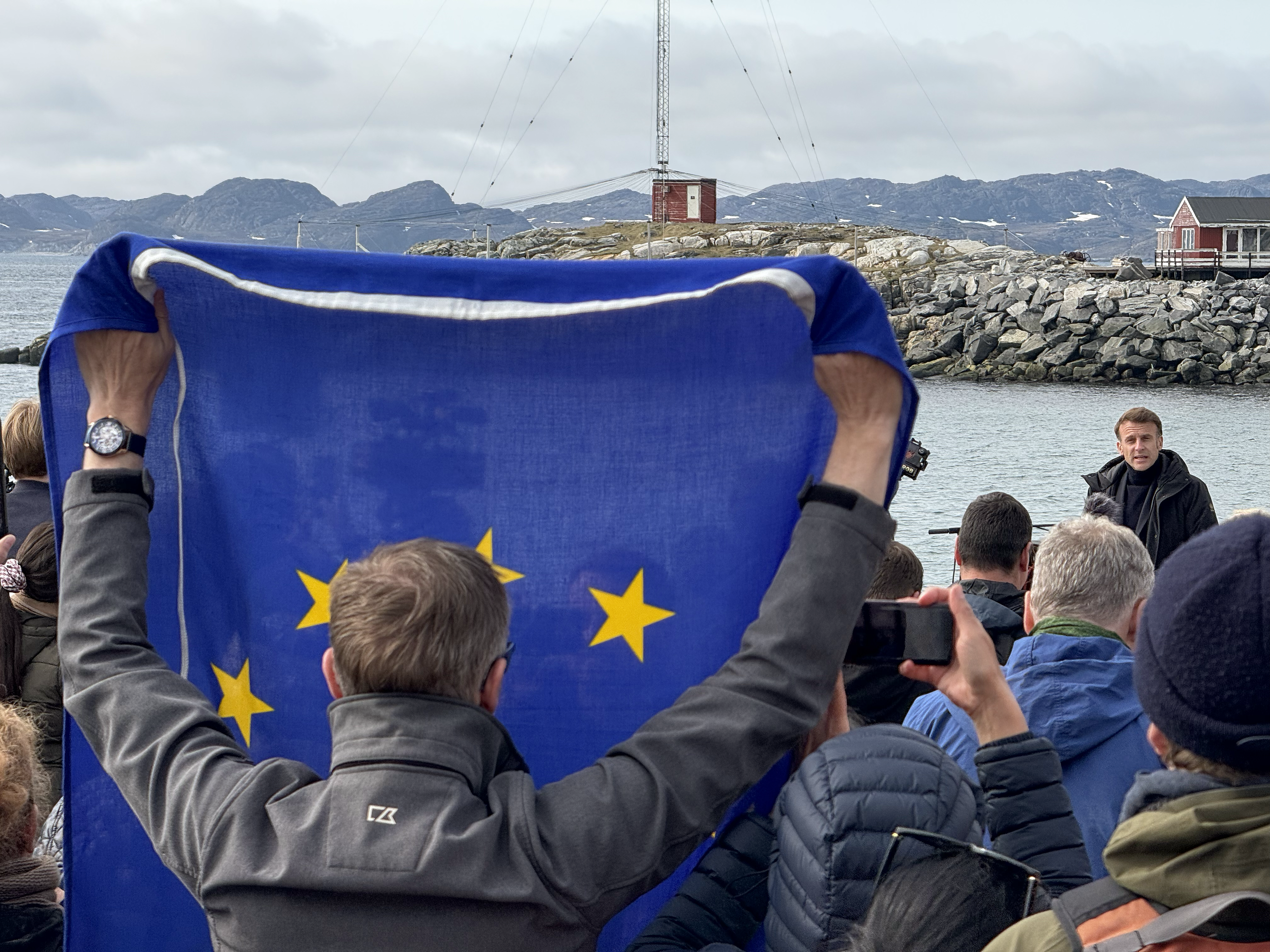
Emmanuel Macron at a Nuuk press conference in 2025

Greenland has joined the Association of the Overseas Countries and Territories of the European Union (OCTA). It was founded on 17 November 2000, during the conference of prime ministers of overseas countries and territories in Brussels, Belgium. OCTA includes almost all special member state territories of European Union whose purpose is to improve economic development in overseas countries and territories and cooperation with the European Union. It currently (2024) has 13 members. On 25 June 2008, a Cooperation Treaty between the EU and OCTA was signed in Brussels.

In 2012, Greenland and Prime Minister of Greenland, Kuupik Kleist, held the chairmanship of the organisation.

== EU–Greenland partnership ==
Countries that could join the European Union: Current members Candidate countries Applicant / potential candidate countries Membership possible Countries located (at least partially) in Europe Membership rejected

Greenland is eligible for EU funding. Between 2007 and 2013, the EU allocated approximately € 190 million, and between 2014 and 2020, € 217.8 million are planned for sustainable development, with focus on education. In 2015, a joint declaration about closer relations between EU and Greenland was signed by Denmark, Greenland and the EU.

In March 2015, the President of the EU Commission, the Prime Minister of Denmark and Greenland's Premier signed 'an umbrella' framework document outlining EU-Greenland relations, a "Joint Declaration on relations between the European Union, on the one hand, and the Government of Greenland and the Government of Denmark, on the other". By this document, the EU confirms its long lasting links with Greenland and reiterates the geostrategic importance of Greenland for the EU.

The Brexit debate has reignited talk about the EU in Greenland, and there have been calls for the island to rejoin the Union. In 2024 an opinion poll found that 60 percent of Greenland's population would vote in favour of re-joining the EU, an increase from 2021 when only 40 percent were in favour.

In late January 2026, during the Greenland crisis, a survey commissioned by The Copenhagen Post found that only 5% of Greenlanders favoured closer cooperation with the United States, while 65% favoured closer cooperation with the European Union, and 29% stated no position.

Early in September 2026, European Commission President Ursula von der Leyen announced a substantial investment in sectors including critical minerals, satellite communications and renewable energy.

== Outside the EU ==
Greenland originally joined the then-European Communities with Denmark in 1973. At that time Greenland had had no autonomy from Denmark, which it gained in 1979. Greenland achieved some special treatment such as restrictions on business for non-residents and fisheries. Greenland got the right to one European Parliament member in the parliament election 1979.

Greenland left in 1985, following a referendum in 1982 with 53% voting for withdrawal after a dispute over fishing rights. The Greenland Treaty formalised its exit.

There has been some speculation as to whether Greenland might consider rejoining the European Union, although this seems highly unlikely to occur any time soon. On 4 January 2007, the Danish daily Jyllands-Posten quoted the former Danish minister for Greenland, Tom Høyem, as having said: "I would not be surprised if Greenland again becomes a member of the EU ... The EU needs the Arctic window and Greenland cannot alone manage the gigantic Arctic possibilities". The debate was reignited during the 2008–2011 Icelandic financial crisis. The EU Common Fisheries Policy (CFP) is an important reason why Greenland, Norway, and Iceland are staying outside the EU. There was hope that the Icelandic negotiations on EU membership 2011–2013 could create an exception to the CFP but the negotiations never got that far. "Gigantic Arctic possibilities" refers to natural resources such as mining.

== EU–Greenland–US relations ==
In mid-January 2026, ahead of a meeting at the White House involving officials from Greenland, Denmark and the United States, Denmark announced a strengthening of its military presence in Greenland while working with NATO allies to increase activity in the Arctic. Meanwhile, France said it plans to open a consulate in Greenland on 6 February, 2026. A bipartisan US-Congressional delegation visited Copenhagen, to display unity and ease tensions, while special envoy Jeff Landry posted on social media that he would help "make Greenland part of the U.S." In May 2026 Landry and his wife visited in anticipation of the Future Greenland business conference scheduled by Business Greenland for May 19-20.

Greenlanders are reported to refute US-president Trump’s narrative of an imminent Chinese and Russian threat. Europeans are working on a response to Mr. Trump’s pressure campaign. Already, Denmark had announced a $ 2 billion military expansion in the Arctic. At the same time, some Silicon Valley tech investors are promoting Greenland as a site for a libertarian utopia (freedom city). Greenland's Prime Minister Jens-Frederik Nielsen is not in favor of a deal with the United States granting sovereignty for American military bases on Greenland.

According to Julie Rademacher, president of Uagut, the national organisation for Greenlanders in Denmark, Greenlandic high trust society "is built on values that clash sharply with modern American political culture: collectivism over individualism, trust over spectacle, continuity over disruption, modesty over hyperbole, and nature as an intrinsic value — not a resource to be 'unlocked'."

In late January 2026 double track procedures were agreed upon according to Mark Rutte: NATO will take on more responsibilities in defending the Arctic; there will be direct talks between Greenland, Denmark, and the US without participation of NATO.

In February 2026 Canada and France opened Greenland consulates. As a show of solidarity Canada’s first Indigenous governor general, Mary Simon, was greeted in Nuuk by several dozen of the 90 Canadian Inuit who had flown in. The EU has been represented on Greenland since 2024.

In August 2026 the US company Greenland Energy landed drilling equipment on Jameson Land. According to the Guardian Greenland’s government issued a “strong warning” that no approval had been granted to land the kit.

In September 2026 an agreement on Greenland's and US security was announced, that would not compromise Greenland’s sovereignty. Greenland is viewed essential for a planned Golden Dome defense system.

In October 2026 US President Donald Trump announced, that extensive oil, gas, and mineral exploration was to begin in Greenland. "Under the existing legal arrangements, however, the United States has no independent authority to drill for oil in Greenland, and the September 2026 defense agreement does not grant American companies automatic exploration or extraction rights." Also Grønlands Regering "has not approved the drilling program, and the required environmental and administrative procedures remain incomplete," Edmarverson Santos writes. The EU set up a new strategy for the Arctic regions of Denmark, Finland, Sweden to cooperate with "like-minded northern neighbours." To realize its long-term vision of digital connectivity in the Arctic, the EU is working on a Pan-Arctic Cable concept. The strategy rejects fossil fuel extraction in the region putting security threats front and centre. No financing plans were revealed. Meanwhile Greenland’s government is close to approving the mining plans of developer Critical Metals Corp. for the Tanbreez rare earth project in South Greenland. The EU has revised its Critical Raw Materials Act establishing a series of benchmarks for 2030.

== See also ==
- Denmark and the European Union
- Foreign relations of Greenland
  - Overseas Countries and Territories Association (OCTA)
  - Greenland Representation to the European Union
  - Proposed United States acquisition of Greenland
- European Union
  - Arctic policy of the European Union
  - Special territories of members of the European Economic Area (OCT)
  - Enlargement of the European Union
- Greenland (European Parliament constituency)
- Withdrawal of Greenland from the European Communities
  - 1982 Greenlandic European Communities membership referendum
- Iceland–European Union relations
- Norway–European Union relations
- United Kingdom–European Union relations
- Climate change in the Arctic
- Critical raw materials
