= 1984 European Parliament election in Greenland =

- 17 June 1984

1 seat to the European Parliament
- Turnout: 35.64%
	First party
Party	Siumut
Seats won	1
Popular vote	7,364
Percentage	63.46%

An election was held in Greenland (a constituent country of the Kingdom of Denmark) in 1984 to elect its delegation to the European Parliament. This was the last election that Greenland took part in prior to the secession of Greenland from the European Union in 1985.

== Results ==
Party	Votes	%	Seats	+/–
Siumut	7,364	63.46	1	0
Atassut	4,241	36.54	0	0
Total	11,605	100.00	1	0
Valid votes	11,605	93.95		
Invalid/blank votes	747	6.05		
Total votes	12,352	100.00		
Registered voters/turnout	34,653	35.64		
Source: Folketingsårbog 1983–84

== See also ==
- 1984 European Parliament election in Denmark
- Greenland (European Parliament constituency)
