= Finn Lynge =

Danish politician and author (1933–2014)

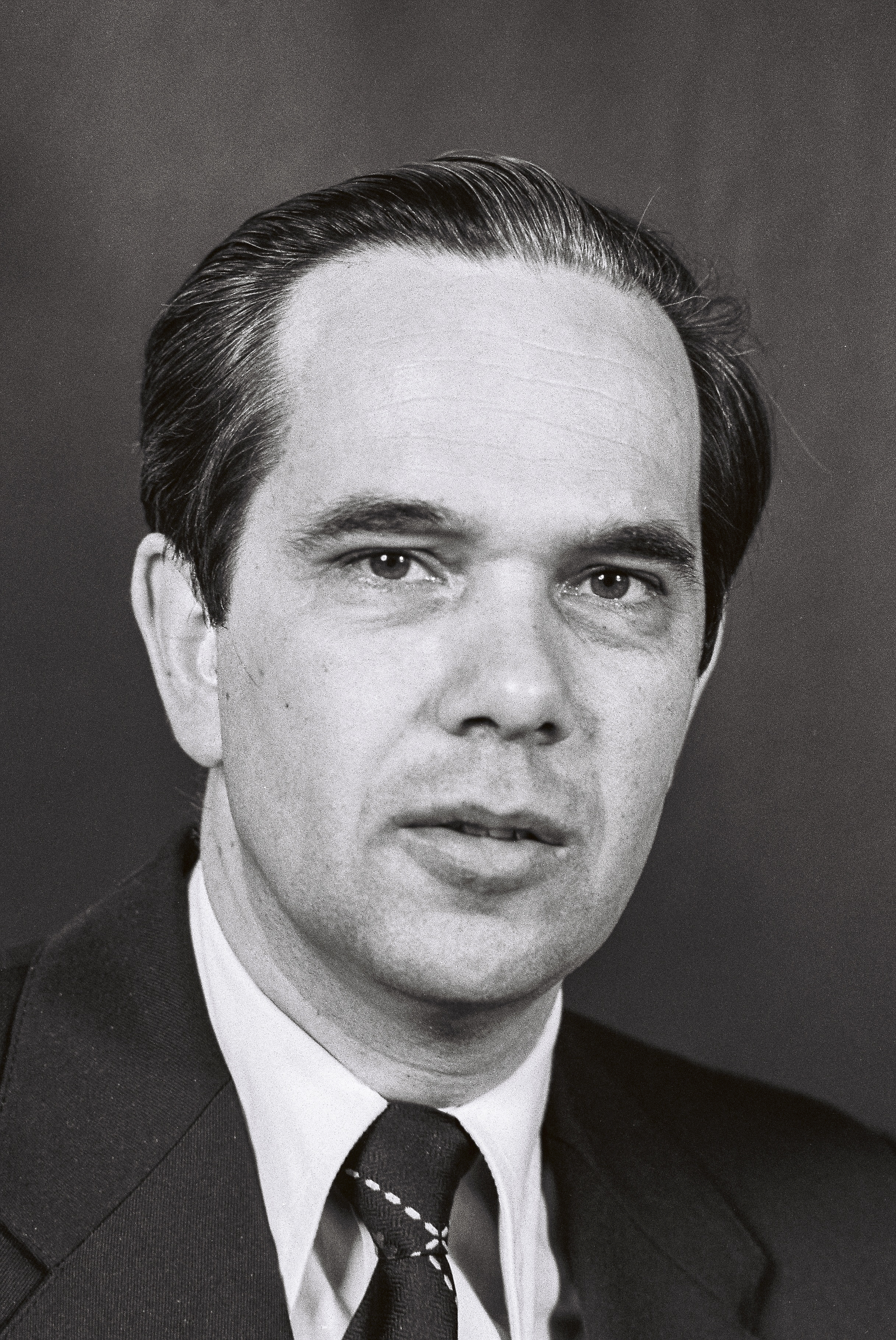

Member of the European Parliament for Greenland
- In office 17 July 1979 – 31 December 1984
- Preceded by: Constituency created
- Succeeded by: Constituency abolished
- Constituency: Greenland

Personal details
- Born: 22 April 1933 Nuuk, Greenland, Kingdom of Denmark
- Died: 4 April 2014 (aged 80) Qaqortoq, Greenland, Kingdom of Denmark
- Party: Siumut
- Parent: Kristoffer Lynge (father)
- Education: University of Copenhagen
- Occupation: Writer, Politician, Activist

Finn Lynge (22 April 1933 – 4 April 2014) was a Greenlandic politician, Indigenous rights activist, former Catholic priest and civil servant who from 1979 until 1984 was the sole Member of the European Parliament for Greenland.

== Early life and career ==
Lynge was born in 1933 and grew up in Nuuk. As a teenager he moved to Denmark with his parents and graduated from secondary school in 1951. Lynge studied Danish and French at the University of Copenhagen before serving in the military.

He trained to be a Catholic priest before serving in Minneapolis, Minnesota, United States, from 1963 to 1964. He later served as a priest in Denmark and in Greenland. He was the first native Greenlander Catholic priest since the Protestant Reformation. He subsequently resigned as a priest to marry.

Following that Lynge spent several years working for the Danish Ministry of Foreign Affairs and for the Greenlandic Government.

== Indigenous activism and political career ==
Lynge served as a director for the Kalaallit Nunaata Radioa. Lynge also authored several books in Greenlandic, Danish and English. From 1992 to 1995 he was a member of the Board of the International Work Group for Indigenous Affairs.

From 1979 until 1984, he was the sole Member of the European Parliament for Greenland. Lynge campaigned for Greenland's withdrawal and his seat was abolished when Greenland withdrew from the European Communities. He was opposed to Greenlandic membership of the European Communities and campaigned strongly for withdrawal.

== Parliamentary service ==
- Member, Committee on Agriculture (1979–81, 1982–84)
- Member, Committee on the Environment, Public Health and Consumer Protection (1981–82)
- Member, Committee on Legal Affairs and Citizens' Rights (1984)
