= 1979 European Parliament election in Greenland =

- 7–10 June 1979

1 seats to the European Parliament
- Turnout: 33.48%
	First party
Party	Siumut
Seats won	1
Popular vote	5,118
Percentage	55.27%

The 1979 European Parliament election in Greenland was the election of the delegation from the constituent country Greenland of the Kingdom of Denmark to the European Parliament in 1979.

== Results ==
Party	Votes	%	Seats
Siumut	5,118	55.27	1
Atassut	4,142	44.73	0
Total	9,260	100.00	1
Valid votes	9,260	94.76	
Invalid/blank votes	512	5.24	
Total votes	9,772	100.00	
Registered voters/turnout	29,188	33.48	
Source: Folketingsårbog 1978–79

== See also ==
- 1979 European Parliament election in Denmark
- Greenland (European Parliament constituency)
