= Greenland–United Kingdom relations =

- Greenland: United Kingdom

Diplomatic mission
- Embassy of Denmark, London: Consulate of the United Kingdom, Nuuk

Greenland–United Kingdom relations are the foreign and bilateral relations between Greenland and the United Kingdom.

== Economic relations ==
Greenland–United Kingdom Partnership, Trade and Cooperation Agreement
- Type: Free trade agreement
- Context: Trade continuity agreement between Greenland and the United Kingdom
- Negotiators: Naaja Nathanielsen; Peter Kyle
- Parties: Greenland; United Kingdom
- Language: English

Seafood Trade forms the cornerstone of British–Greenlandic economic relations. The UK imports approximately £70 million worth of seafood annually from Greenland, primarily comprising prawns, shrimp, and cod. Following Brexit, these products became subject to tariffs of up to 20%, significantly increasing costs for British processors, restaurants, and consumers. In October 2025, the UK and Greenland resumed negotiations on a Partnership, Trade and Cooperation Agreement, aiming to eliminate these tariffs and restore preferential access.

From 2 December 2001 until 30 December 2020, trade between Greenland and the UK was governed by the European Union–Overseas Countries and Territories Free Trade Agreement, while the United Kingdom was a member of the European Union.

Following the withdrawal of the United Kingdom from the European Union, the UK and Greenland opened negotiations for a trade continuity agreement on 27 January 2022. By July 2023, trade negotiations between the two countries stagnated and were removed from the UK's trade negotiations agenda. On 2 October 2025, both countries agreed to resume negotiations on the Greenland–United Kingdom Partnership, Trade and Cooperation Agreement at the 7th European Political Community Summit in Copenhagen. The trade negotiations also include a critical minerals partnership, a key point in negotiations as British mining companies held a third of mining licences in Greenland in 2025.

== Diplomatic missions ==
- Greenland does not maintain a representation in the United Kingdom; Greenland develops relations with the UK through the Danish embassy in London.
- The United Kingdom is accredited to Greenland through its consulate in Nuuk.

== See also ==
- Denmark–United Kingdom relations
- Foreign relations of Denmark
- Foreign relations of Greenland
- Foreign relations of the United Kingdom
- Free trade agreements of the United Kingdom
- GIUK gap
