= Foreign relations of Greenland =

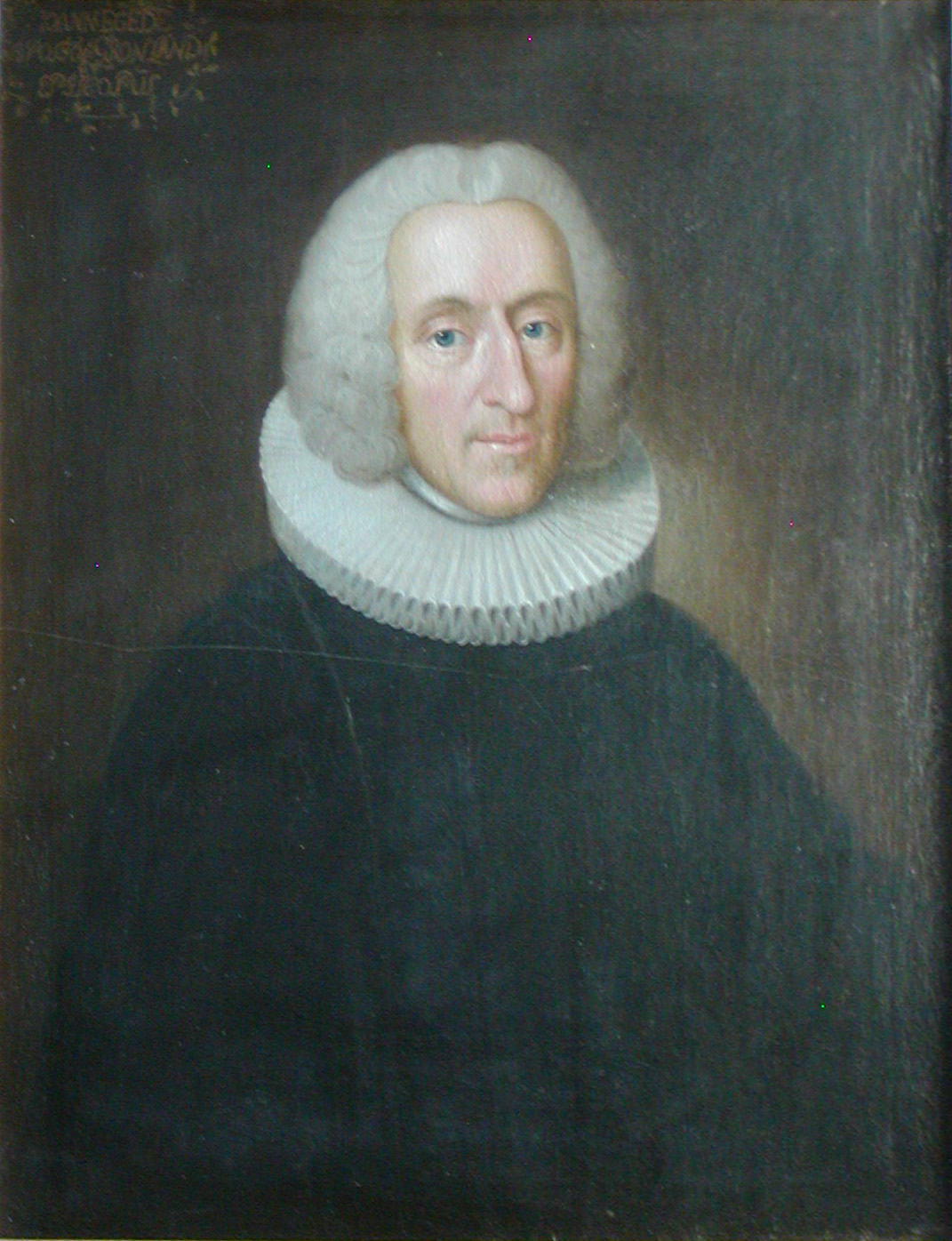
Hans Egede (1686–1758), Lutheran missionary, credited with revitalising Denmark's relationship with Greenland

Being part of the Kingdom of Denmark, the foreign relations of Greenland are handled in cooperation between the government of Denmark and the government of Greenland. Unlike Denmark proper, Greenland is not part of the European Union (EU). The country's status was changed to an Overseas Country and Territory (OCT) associated with the EU, a dependent territory that has a special relationship with a member state of the EU. However, Greenland remains a part of the Council of Europe and NATO as part of Denmark.

== General aspects of diplomatic relations ==
With the Kingdom of Denmark having the responsibility for Greenland's international affairs, other countries often do not have direct diplomatic representation in Greenland—their embassies or consulates in Denmark are responsible for their relations with Greenland and their citizens in Greenland. Greenland is represented internationally by both the Greenland Representations and the embassies and consulates of Denmark. Further Greenland participates in the parliamentary Nordic Council and the Nordic Council of Ministers, and organisations as the West Nordic Council and the EU-based Overseas Countries and Territories Association, the latter being former colonies of member states of the EU (dependent countries/territories).

The United States reopened its consulate in June 2020, in Nuuk, after it closed in 1953.

== Diplomatic representations ==
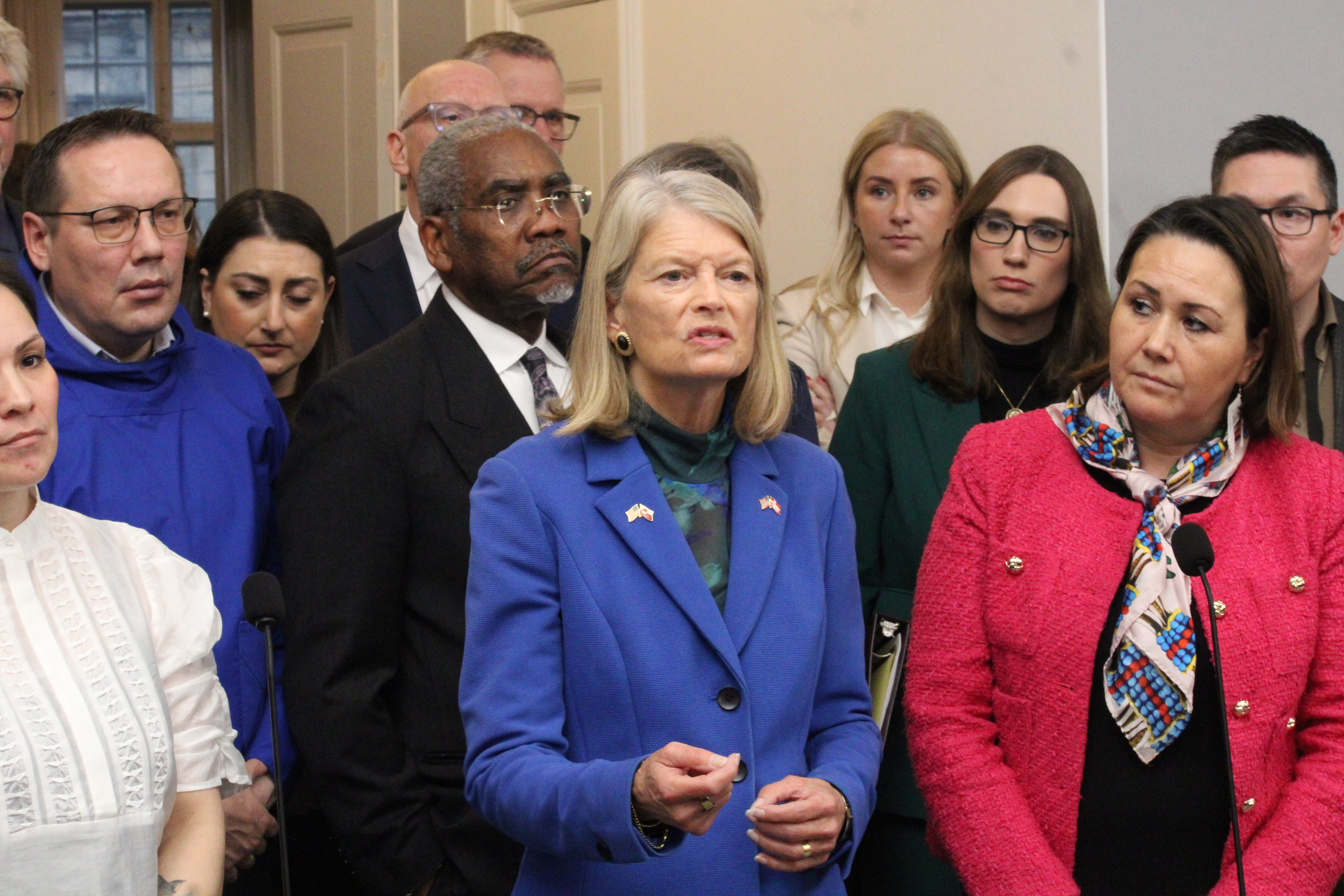
Greenlandic, Danish and U.S. politicians meeting at Christiansborg in Copenhagen during the Greenland crisis, January 2026

The Premier of Greenland is unable to speak to a foreign leader without a Danish ambassador present. Greenland has representative offices in several countries and otherwise is represented by embassies of Denmark worldwide. The Self-Government Act of 2009 allows the government of Greenland to open diplomatic offices, mainly within areas of full jurisdiction of Greenland, this being foreign trade, industry, fisheries, education, science, mining etc. Further Greenlandic diplomats, representing the government of Greenland, participate in areas of shared responsibilities between Denmark and Greenland, this mainly being observed in the defence cooperation between the Kingdom of Denmark and the United States.

=== Current representations ===
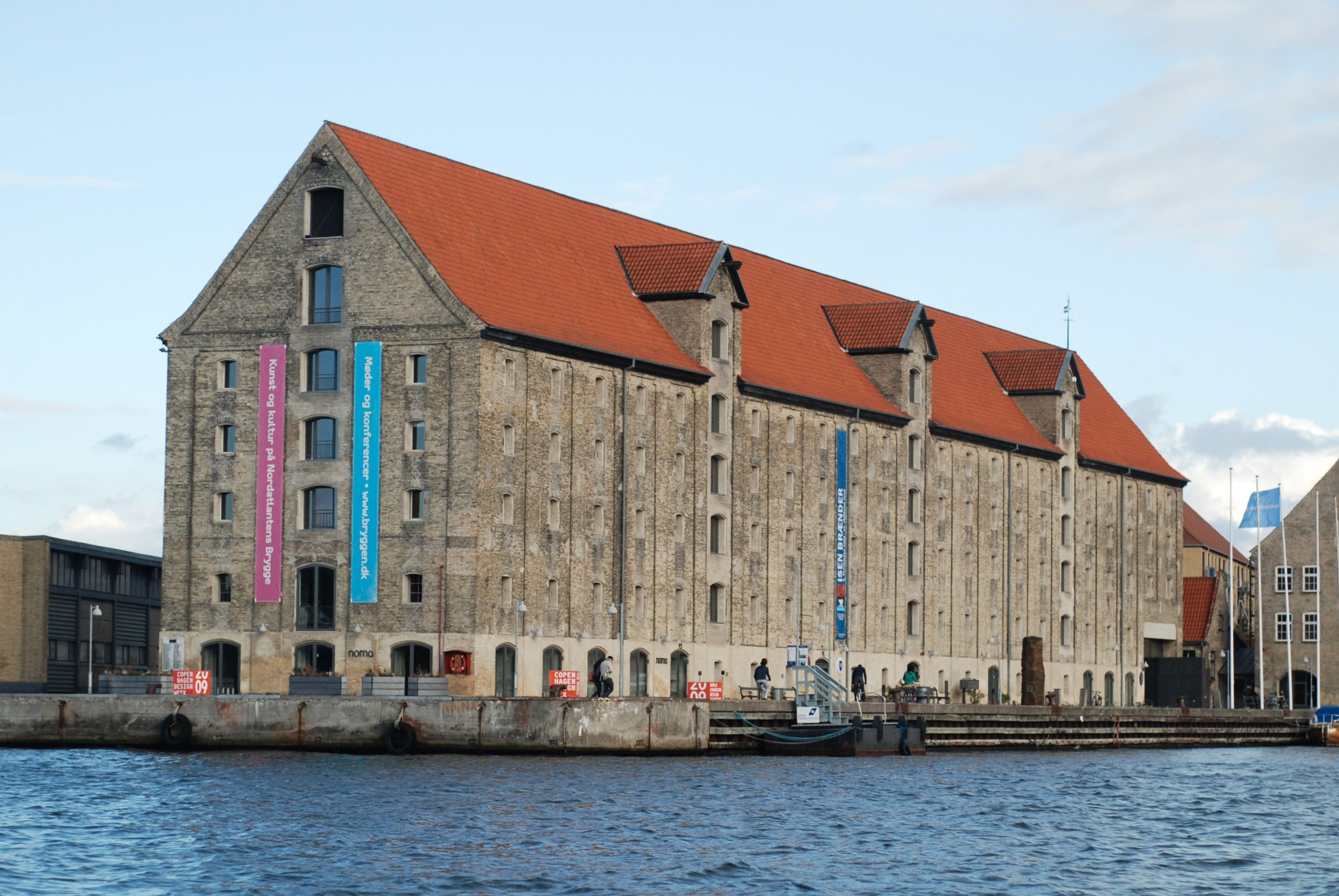
Representative Office of Greenland in Copenhagen

- European Union
  - Brussels (Representative Office)
- China
  - Beijing (Representative Office)
- Denmark
  - Copenhagen (Representative Office)
- Iceland
  - Reykjavík (Representative Office)
- United States
  - Washington, D.C. (Representative Office)

=== Planned representations ===
- United States
  - New York City (Representative Office)

== Diplomatic missions in Greenland ==
=== High Commission ===
- Nuuk, Greenland
  - Denmark (High Commission)

=== Consulate general ===
- Nuuk, Greenland
  - Iceland (Consulate General)
  - France (Consulate general)

=== Consulate ===
- Nuuk, Greenland
  - Canada (Consulate)
  - United States (Consulate)

=== Honorary consuls ===
- Nuuk, Greenland
  - Belgium (honorary consul)
  - Czech Republic (honorary consul)
  - Finland (honorary consul)
  - Germany (honorary consul)
  - Luxembourg (honorary consul)
  - Netherlands (honorary consul)
  - Norway (honorary consul)
  - Russia (honorary consul)
  - Sweden (honorary consul)
  - United Kingdom (honorary consul)
- Tasiilaq, Greenland
  - Iceland (honorary consul)

=== Representative Office ===
- Nuuk, Greenland
  - European Union (Representative Office)

== Disputes ==
- Pituffik and Old Thule is a sensitive area, due to the forced removal of the local population when establishing the U.S. military base, handling of removal, compensation of the locals, later incidents aggravated the case.

== See also ==
- Greenland and the European Union
- Greenland–United Kingdom relations
- Politics of Greenland
- Proposals for the United States to purchase Greenland
