= Greenland Representation to the European Union =

- Location: Rue d'Arlon 71 Brussels, Belgium

The Greenland Representation to the European Union in Brussels is the official representative office of Greenland to the European Union. The Greenland Representation to the European Union was established in 1992 in connection to the Royal Danish Embassy in Belgium. Greenland Representation to the European Union is located together with The Royal Danish Embassy, and the Mission of the Faroes to the European Union.

As the Government of Greenland delegate, the minister counsellor is credentialed to Belgium and maintains The Government of Greenland relations with the EU institutions.

== Greenland Treaty ==
A referendum was held in 1982 and a sparse majority voted in favour of withdrawal from the European Community. Between 1982 and 1984 the terms were negotiated and on February 1, 1985, Greenland formally withdrew. A treaty on Greenland's withdrawal from the community was made – the Greenland Treaty – declaring Greenland as a “special case”.

This "special case" provided a fisheries agreement between the parties in which the European Community and later the European Union kept its fishing rights and Greenland kept its financial contribution as before the withdrawal. It also gave Greenland tariff-free access of fisheries products to the EU as long as there exists a satisfactory fisheries agreement. Greenland is furthermore associated with the EU through its placement in the Overseas Country and Territories Association decision.

== The Partnership Agreement 2014–2020 ==
Focus in the Joint Declaration of the Partnership Agreement is the objective to further strengthen the relations and cooperation between the EU and Greenland on different areas ranging from research, sustainable development over industry and education and training and in a long-term perspective.

The focal sector of the partnership agreement period 2014–2020 is education and training. In order to develop this specific sector with regards to a sustainable human development in an era of globalisation.

It is reflected in the partnership agreement that the relationship between Greenland and the EU is mutually beneficial. Furthermore, the overall goal is to diversify Greenland's economy.

== See also ==
- Unity of the Realm
- List of diplomatic missions in Belgium
- Enlargement of the European Union
- Greenland–European Union relations
- Greenland (European Parliament constituency)
- 1982 Greenlandic European Economic Community membership referendum
