= Fishing industry in Denmark =

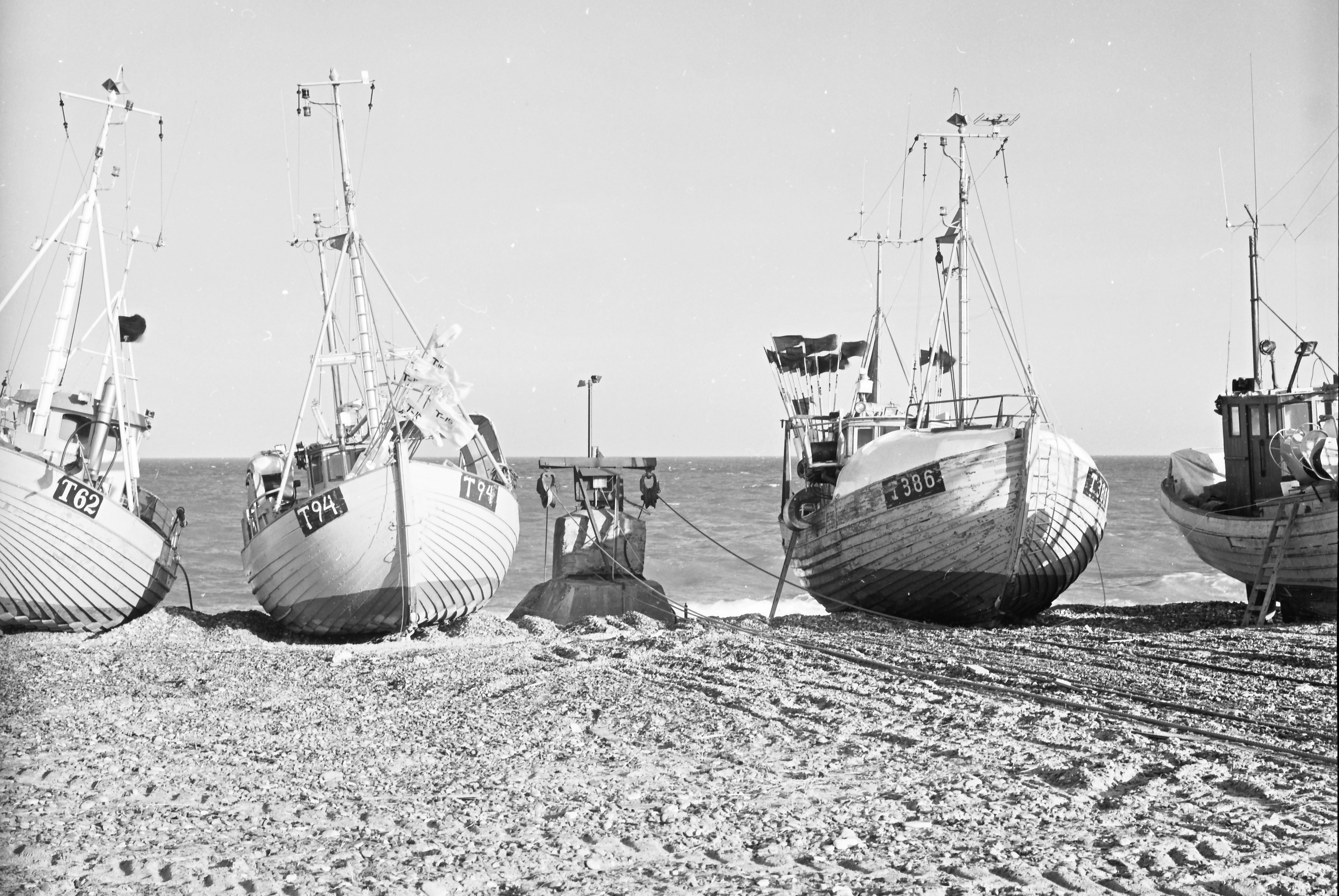
Fishing boats drawn up on the beach at Lild Strand, North Western Jutland, Denmark

The fishing industry in Denmark operates around the coastline, from western Jutland to Bornholm. While the overall contribution of the fisheries sector to the country's economy is only about 0.5 percent, Denmark is ranked fifth in the world in exports of fish and fish products. Approximately 20,000 Danish people are employed in fishing, aquaculture, and related industries.

Denmark's coastline measures about 7,300 kilometres (4,500 mi) in length, and supports three types of fishery industries: for fish meal and fish oil, pelagic fishery for human consumption, and the demersal fishery for white fish, lobster and deep water prawns. The key ports for demersal fishing are Esbjerg, Thyborøn, Hanstholm, Hirtshals, and Skagen. The North Sea and Skagen account for 80% of the catches.

The Danish fishing fleet is noted for its economic democracy: the value of the catch is shared by everyone on the ship according to a pre-set scale, and this system unites the whole crew's interest in returning the largest possible catch.

== History ==
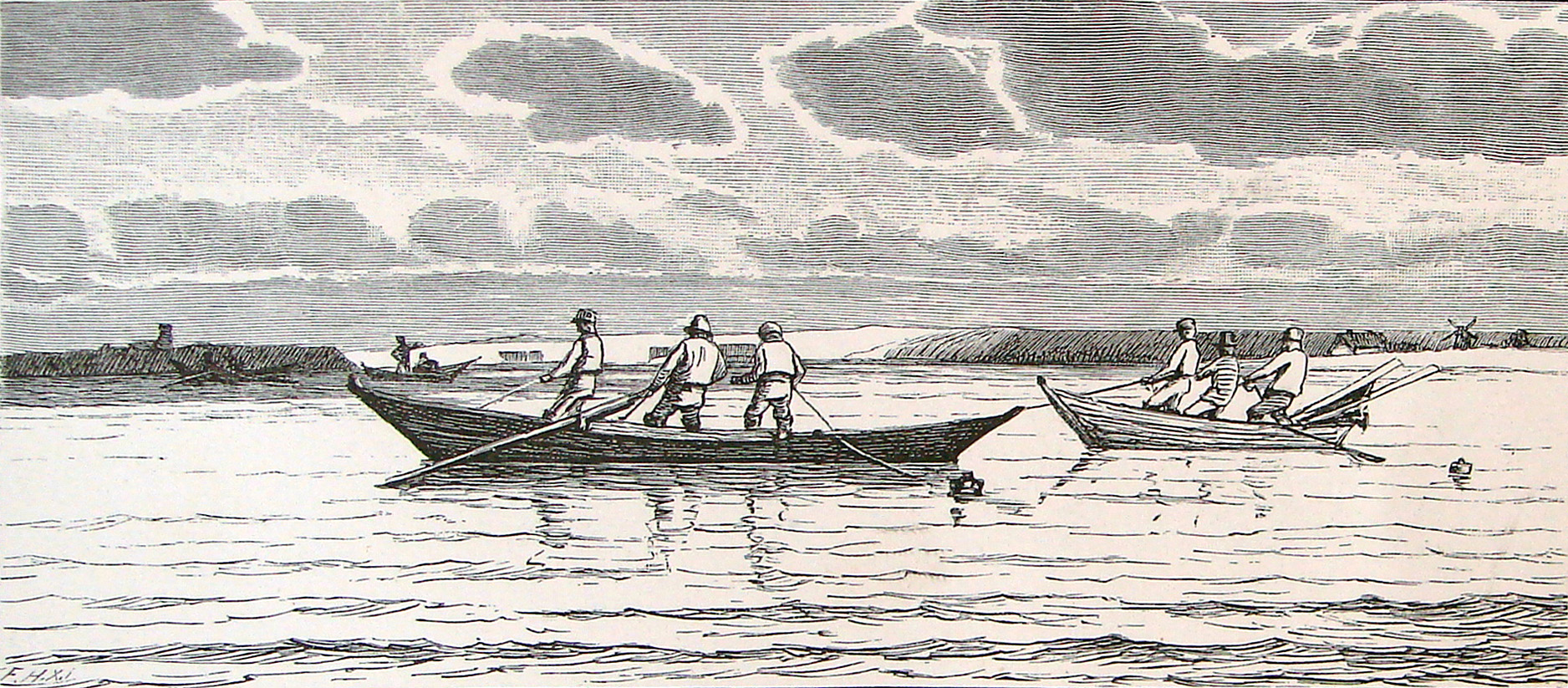
Snurrevodsfiskere in Limfjord, 1893

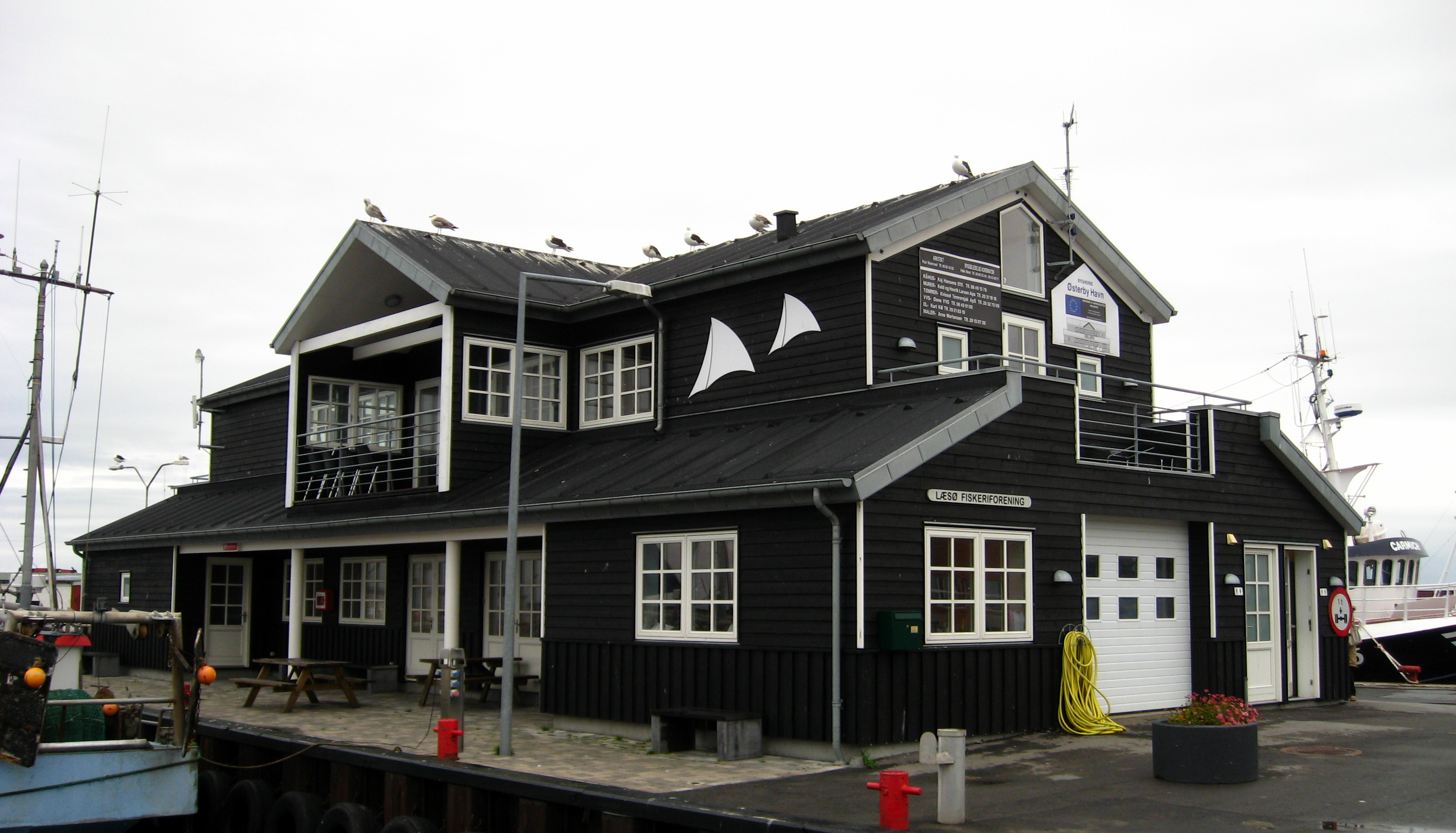
Fishermen Association on Læsø, Denmark

The fishing industry in Denmark is a main source of income to households. While fishing is a practice noted from the Medieval times, particularly in the coastal area of Denmark for eel fishing with woven traps, the earliest innovation in fisheries was not recorded until 1849 when the Danish seine or anchor seine technique of fishing was introduced resulting in unprecedented quantities of fish catch from the Limfjord.

During 1856, the Danish Royal Trade Monopoly that was practiced since 1709 was annulled. In 1872, the first fishing vessels started operating in East Iceland when ship made of steel made in England replaced the wooden vessels. This created many new opportunities for the Faroese, and played an important part in the development of the Faroese fishing industry. This method of fishing spread to Esbjerg on the south-west Jutland coast in 1880 when transportation using rail links facilitated export to Europe. Esbjerg became a popular site for all Danes for fishing plaice in early 1900 when motorized boats were also introduced for the operations. During 1939–40, the Tórshavn Shipyard in Faroes built the 'Vónin' (Hope) which was the first ship of Denmark. From 1920 to 1950, the fishing vessels known as the blue ships of Denmark were conspicuously plied for deep-sea fishing in the North Sea. Now, Danish seine is considered a major fishing technique in the world. In the 20th century, deep sea fishing came to dominate the scene. However. this has not discouraged the use of long line fishing technique with use of several hooks on short lines that are attached to a main line.

In 1903, the fishery limit for the Faroe Islands was 3 nautical-miles under an agreement signed between Denmark and Great Britain. In 1959, it was extended to 12 nautical miles and Denmark officially implemented this policy from 1964. In 1978, the 200-nautical mile limit came into force, which is now in vogue, on the same lines as adopted by North Atlantic nations.

== Fishing categories ==
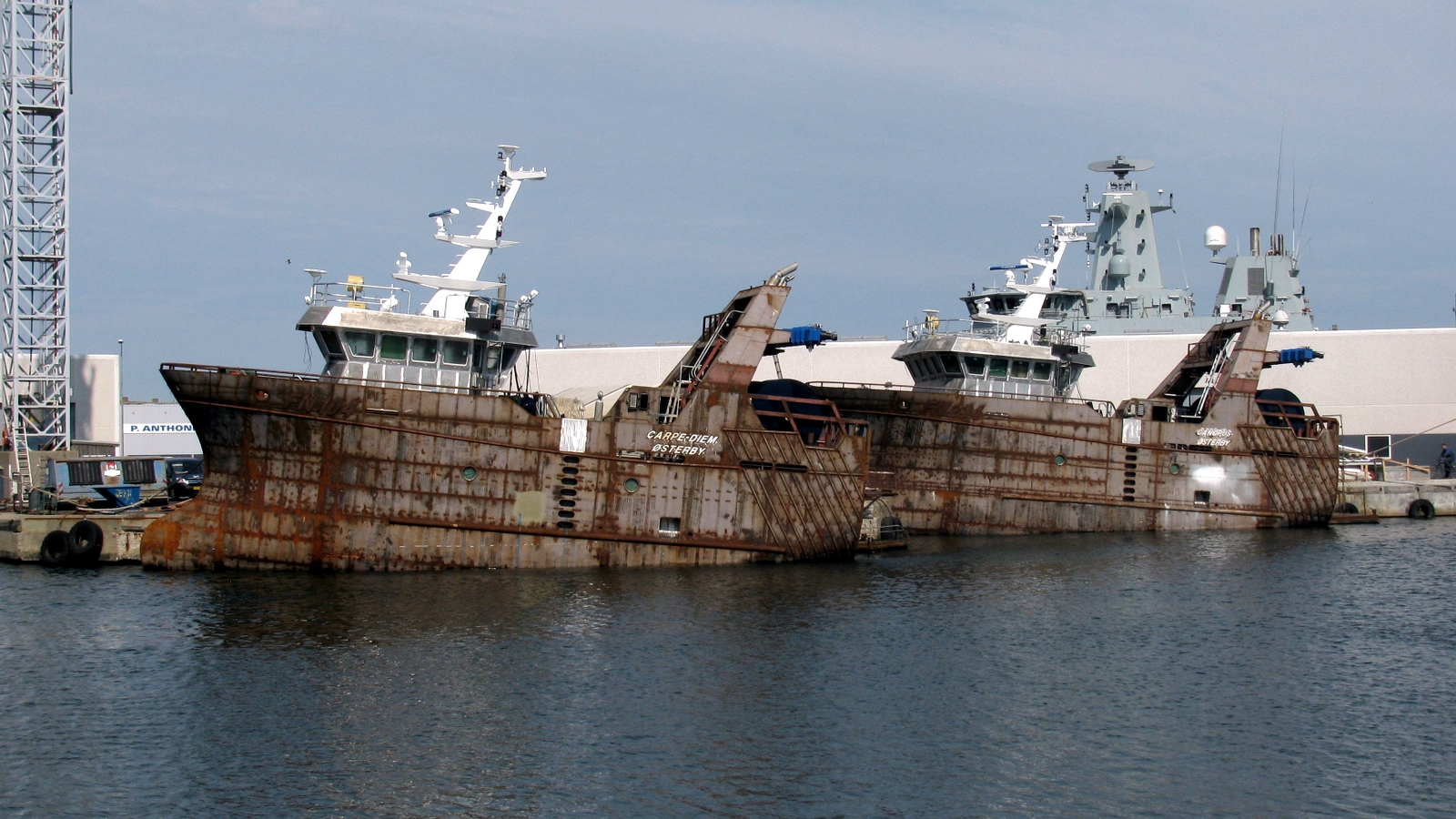
Fishing boat in Skagen

Three broad categories of fishing in Denmark are industrial fishery, fishery for human consumption (also known as pelagic fishing), and demersal fishery. Industrial fishing is for industrial use of producing fish oil and fish meal. Initially, Industrial fishing using trawlers began in the 1940s with herring fishing in the North Sea. Over time, other fish species included sand eel, Norway pout, blue whiting and sprat (sprat in Skagerrak/Kattegat and in the Baltic Sea). By 1993, the percentage of sand eel was about 70%, when the total industrial fish catch was 1.2 million tons. However, in terms of cash value, cod fish was a better catch. This type of fishing is also found to be overall remunerative as it contributes to 27% in financial value from 77% of catch.

For human consumption, the fish species caught are cod, plaice and herring and also species such as hake, dover sole, and turbot. In deep waters, fish species caught are Norway lobster, deep water prawn, and common mussels. In terms of financial value, the fish species of interest, in the order of precedence, are cod, sand eel, plaice, herring and Norway lobster. Stocks of eel has declined since 1970. Method of fishing in this type of fishing practice involves use of stationary or dredging gear, gillnets and pound nets, traps and hooks while for catching mussels special dredgers are adopted.

In demersal fishery, the species fishes caught are white fish (cod, hake, haddock, whiting, saithe), flatfish (sole, plaice, flounder and so forth), lobster and deep water prawns. One feature which needs consolidation is the uniting of small fishing operators of Denmark into one viable major sector, as at present the Norwegians have held this position. As the Danish industrial and cod fisheries role is a major factor in the North Sea, the resource position of a few species is not definite.

The key ports for fishing in the above types of fishing operations are Esbjerg, Thyborøn, Hanstholm, Hirtshals, and Skagen. The North Sea and Skagen account for 80% of the catches. Much of the fishing industry is also located in Greenland and Faroe Islands which are self-governing dependencies of Denmark.

== Processing industries ==
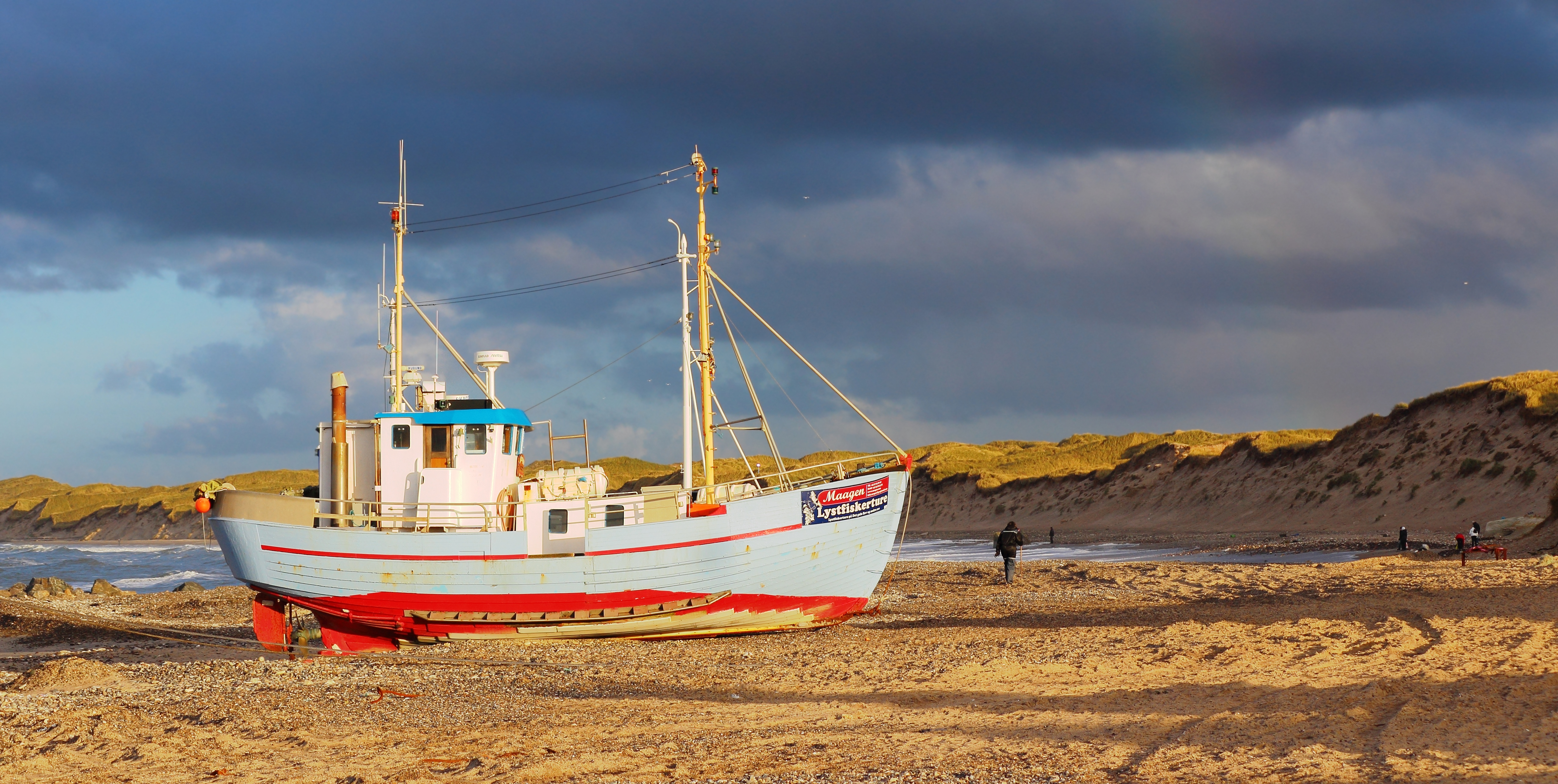
Fishing boat on the beach of Nørre Vorupør, Denmark

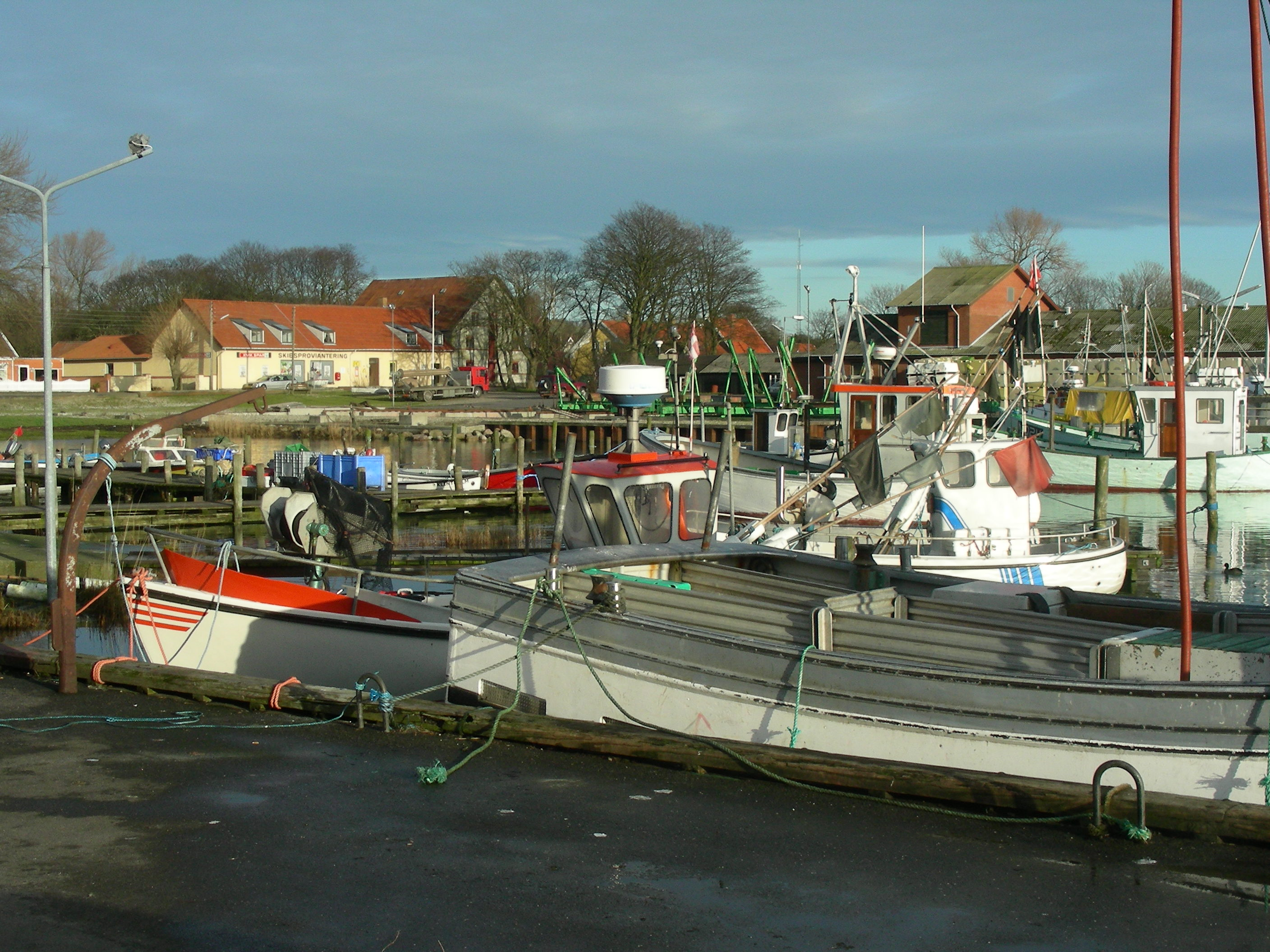
Klintholm Havn, a fishing village on Møn in south-east Denmark

As it provides processing links with many other countries, Denmark imports fish for this activity and its own fishing produce from the sea is exported. One feature which needs consolidation is the uniting of small fishing operators of Denmark into one viable major actor, as at present the Norwegians have held this position.

== Machinery ==
Use of machinery in fishing operations is well developed in Denmark. The number of fishing vessels in operation is 3400 with a crew of crewed of about 5.400. The people employed in this activity are 6.500 people. Democratic values are practiced in the fishing with trawlers, as the fleet involved with the operations shares the catch value equally among all the members of the ship, which is an incentive to every fisherman to bring in more catch

There are prescribed rules and quotas for purchase of fishing vessels. Danish fishing companies are permitted to own vessels provided their fishermen or fishing companies are residents of Denmark. This rule applies to EU or EEC citizens also. One ship owner is permitted to own only four vessels with a combined capacity of GT of 5,000. Fishing volume in one pelagic vessel is restricted to a maximum of 10% of the Danish herring in the North Sea. The quota for mackerel fish is also the same on one vessel. Additional sprat quota/sandeel quota may be purchased for Baltic Sea sprat and Norway pout fishing.

The type of vessels forming the fishing fleets are; trawlers, gill netters and poundnets (50% in this category but with capacity of less than 5GT mostly gill netter); trawlers and purse seiners of 150 GT. A substantial part of the fleet operate under depths of 24 m.

== Recent developments ==
After a few prosperous years for Denmark's fishing industry, figures for 2012 were not so good with profits falling to some DKK 600 million from DKK 900 million per annum previously. The fall is attributed mainly to reductions in sand eel and mackerel catches while the prices of cod, herring and lobster were also expected to fall. Further falls of around 9% were recorded in the consumer figures for the first quarter of 2013 when catches fell to 103,000 tons. Consumer prices also fell some 17% in comparison with 2012. By contrast, industrial fishing prospered with a price rise of 34% which, despite lower catches, brought an increase in profits of 31%.

== National policy and laws ==
Danish fishing industry has patterned its fishing policy based on the European Union's Fisheries Policy (CFP-2002 ) with adaptations to suit its national needs. A quota management system has been introduced. Individual owners are also permitted to have higher fishing rights, and it is in consonance with the policy followed for pelagic and industrial fisheries. The fleet and fleet capacity have been restricted to conform to the EU Policy, which provides for a rigid entry-exit system, and individual transfer of capacity rights has also been allowed. With this policy the export of fish recorded in 2005 was 1.03 million metric tonnes.

National legislation in fishing has been adopted with due quota allocations done under the EU policy with technical rules that are framed on the basis of scientific studies which are carried out regularly. The 1999 Fisheries Act, with a few amendments made in 2002, is in vogue and it relates to fish stocks, specific rules for commercial and recreational fishing and first-hand marketing and duties. A new national strategy along with a new plan of action for fisheries was also developed to meet the requirements of the EU's European Fisheries Fund as a 7-year programme. EU regulations are also a hindrance by the fishermen as biological balance has not been achieved and EU control has led to more wastage.

Another policy aspect is that according to biologists the number of fishermen in the field are quite large and the resources available may not be adequate to sustain all of them to be at par with the national average income level and this would call for greater efficiency of operations with less of wastage.

Over all, the policy Instruments address issues concerning vessel catch limits (could be on monthly basis), individual Transferable quotas (applicable only for herring), limits on number of days per month, Days at sea, time closures ( such as during weekends, summer), licenses for limited and not limited access), lower limit of landing sizes (could be more than those set under CFP in some cases), debarring use of specific gear types in specified areas, limitation on engine power in specified areas, to notifying the fisheries control before landing and satellite monitoring.

The Ministry of Food, Agriculture and Fisheries ensures that a sustainable development of the sector is effectively followed in both fisheries and aquaculture activities. The proactive role played by the Ministry covers regulation and inspections, assistance in research activities, assistance in development activates related fisheries, the fish industry, fishery harbours and aquaculture; and in facilitating licenses for fish management and for recreational fisheries.

== Aquaculture ==
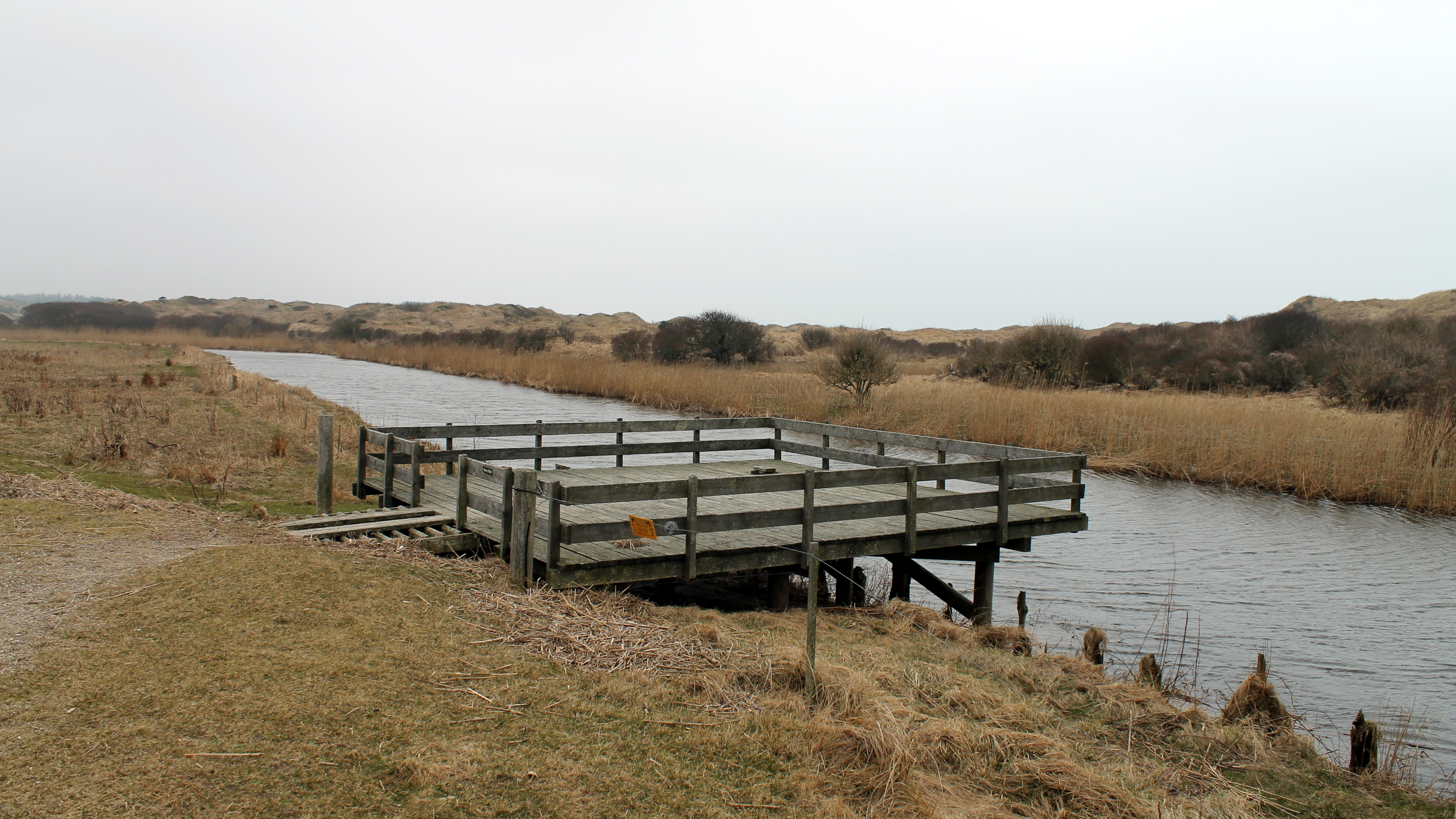
Fresh water fishing, a fishing stand at the mouth of the Uggerby Å River in Denmark

Aquaculture in freshwater ponds and in salt water marshes are also finding increased attention of the government by breeding more species.

Since 2004 new rules are in force for freshwater and saltwater fishing as an aquaculture practice under specific organic labeling. Freshwater fishing in ponds is notable for rainbow trout (Oncorhynchus mykiss); this species is also adopted to land-based marine aquaculture. Eel farming is also popular where water is recirculated in freshwater tanks. Other varieties of fish adopted in freshwater fishing are mussels, oysters and crayfish. Turbot from which is mostly exported is also a species raised under aquaculture. Many species are also raised for stocking. Shellfish has also been produced and its yield was a record 280 metric tonnes between 2004 and 2005. Approval process involves clearance from the Department of Fisheries under the Danish Environment Protection Act; recirculated eel farms are exempt under this Act.

== Environmental issues ==
Environmental issues such as pollution from agricultural land flows with high nutrients have choked the fjords, which are causing the death of fish due to lack of oxygen. Another problem created is death of porpoises which are caught in the nets. Some 7,000 deaths are typically reported annually.

== See also ==
- Fishing industry in Greenland
