= Kristoffer Lynge =

Greenlandic journalist, writer and politician (1894–1967)

Member of the National Council for South Greenland
- In office 1922–1926

Personal details
- Born: 26 November 1894 Nuuk, South Greenland, Kingdom of Denmark
- Died: 19 September 1967 (aged 72) Copenhagen, Denmark
- Children: Finn Lynge
- Occupation: Journalist, writer, politician

Kristoffer Lynge (1894–1967) was a Greenlandic journalist, writer and politician.

== Media and journalism career ==
From 1922 to 1952, Lynge served as editor of the Greenlandic newspaper Atuagagdliutit. Lynge was also involved in Kalaallit Nunaata Radioa and wrote several books on Greenlandic legends as well as translating works from Danish to Greenlandic.

== Political career ==
From 1922 to 1926, Lynge served as a member of the National Council for South Greenland. He later served as a district councillor from 1932 to 1945. He served as a member of the Greenland Commission which was appointed by the provincial government in 1948 to "address the problems of social, political, cultural, and administrative development in Greenland and make proposals for future arrangements in these areas". The commission ultimately produced a six-volume, 1,100-page report.
