= 1982 Greenlandic European Communities membership referendum =

- 23 February 1982
- Do you want Greenland to remain in the European Communities?

Results
Choice	Votes	%
Yes	11,180	46.98%
No	12,615	53.02%
Valid votes	23,795	98.06%
Invalid or blank votes	470	1.94%
Total votes	24,265	100.00%
Registered voters/turnout	32,391	74.91%

A referendum on continued membership of the European Communities (EC) was held in Greenland on 23 February 1982.

Greenland had joined the EC in 1973 when Denmark joined, even though a majority of 70% of the Greenlandic votes in the Danish EC referendum held in 1972 had been against membership. In the spring of 1981, after Greenlandic home rule had been established in 1979 and the eurosceptic party Siumut won the 1979 election, the Parliament of Greenland agreed to hold a referendum on its continued membership. The result of the referendum was a majority in favour of leaving the EC, and this was enacted by the Greenland Treaty, which allowed the EC to keep its fishing rights. Greenland continues to be considered one of the Overseas Countries and Territories of the EU, giving it a special relationship with the Union.

== Results ==
Choice	Votes	%
For	11,180	46.98
Against	12,615	53.02
Total	23,795	100.00
Valid votes	23,795	98.06
Invalid/blank votes	470	1.94
Total votes	24,265	100.00
Registered voters/turnout	32,391	74.91
Source: "Greenland's Withdrawal from the European Communities", by Frederik Harhoff, Common Market Law Review Vol. 20, pages 13-33 (1983)

== See also ==
- Greenland and the European Union
- Greenland (European Parliament constituency)
- Withdrawal of Greenland from the European Communities
