= Greenland (European Parliament constituency) =

Former European Parliament constituency

- European Parliament constituency
- Shown in orange (along with Denmark)
- Member state: Denmark
- Created: 1979
- Dissolved: 1984
- MEPs: 1 (1979–1984)

Greenland was a European Parliament constituency for elections in the European Union covering the territory of Greenland. It seceded from the European Community in 1985. It was represented by one Member of the European Parliament.

== Members of the European Parliament ==
| Elected | Members | Party |
|---|---|---|
| 1979 | Finn Lynge | Siumut |
| 1984 | Finn Lynge | Siumut |
| 1985 | constituency abolished | |

== Elections ==
=== 1979 ===
The 1979 European election was the first election to the European Parliament. The vote was held on 9 June 1979. The eligible electorate was 29,188. Finn Lynge of Siumut was elected.

=== 1984 ===
The 1984 European election was the second election to the European Parliament and the second for Greenland. The vote was held on 14 June 1984, and the eligible electorate was 34,653. Finn Lynge was re-elected. When Greenland seceded from the European Community on 1 January 1985 Lynge's seat was transferred to the Danish Socialist People's Party.

1984 European Parliament election: Greenland
| Party | Candidate | Votes | % | ±% |
|---|---|---|---|---|
| Siumut | Finn Lynge | 7,364 | 63.46 | +8.19 |
| Atassut | Konrad Steenholdt | 4,241 | 36.54 | −8.19 |
| Total formal votes | | 11,605 | 93.95 | −0.81 |
| Informal votes | | 747 | 6.05 | +0.81 |
| Turnout | | 12,352 | 35.64 | +2.16 |
| Siumut hold | | Swing | +8.19 | |

== See also ==
- Accession of Iceland to the European Union
- Enlargement of the European Union
- Representation of Greenland, Brussels
- Greenland–European Union relations
- 1982 Greenlandic European Economic Community membership referendum
- Norway–European Union relations
