= Fishing industry in Greenland =

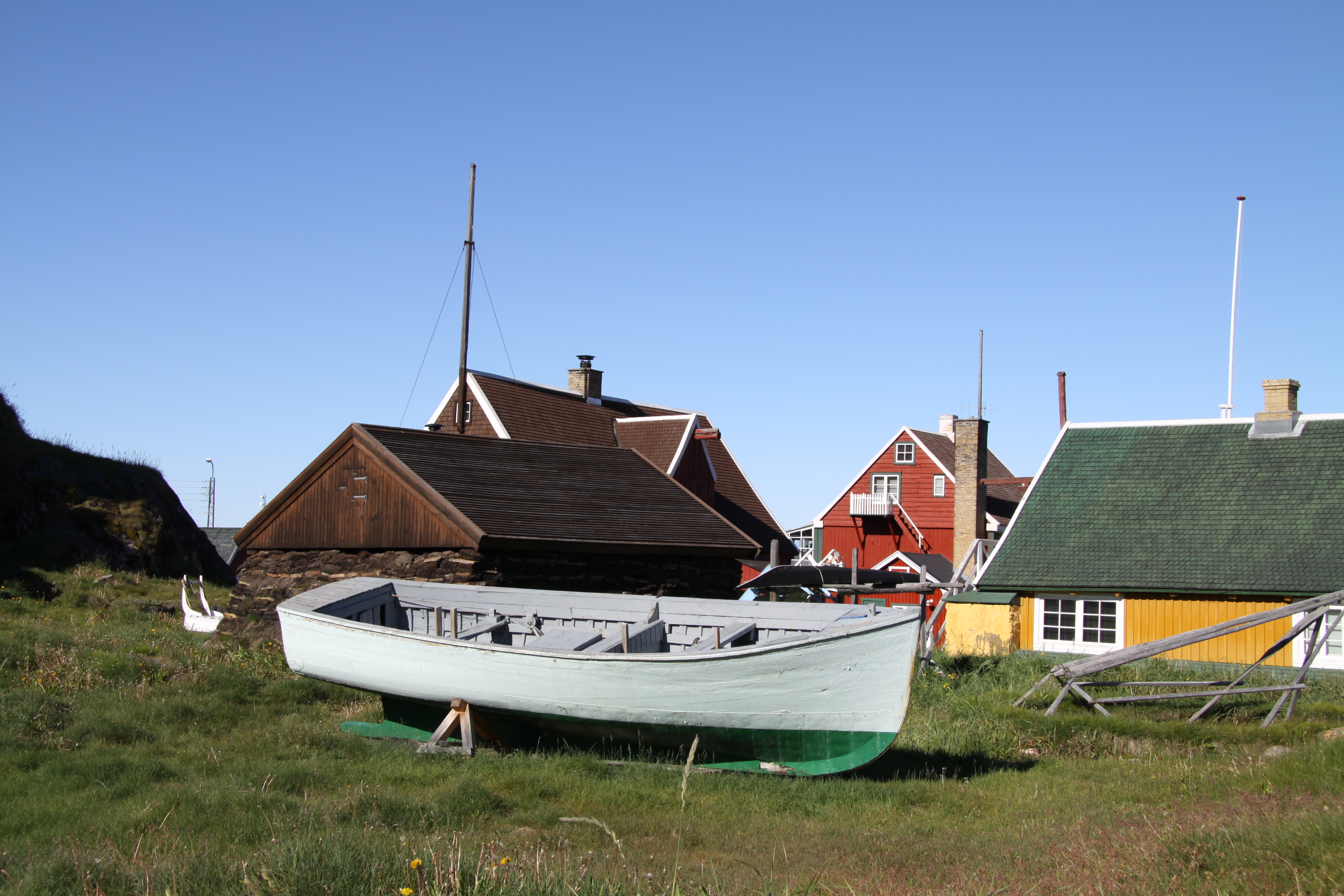
An old fishing boat in Sisimiut

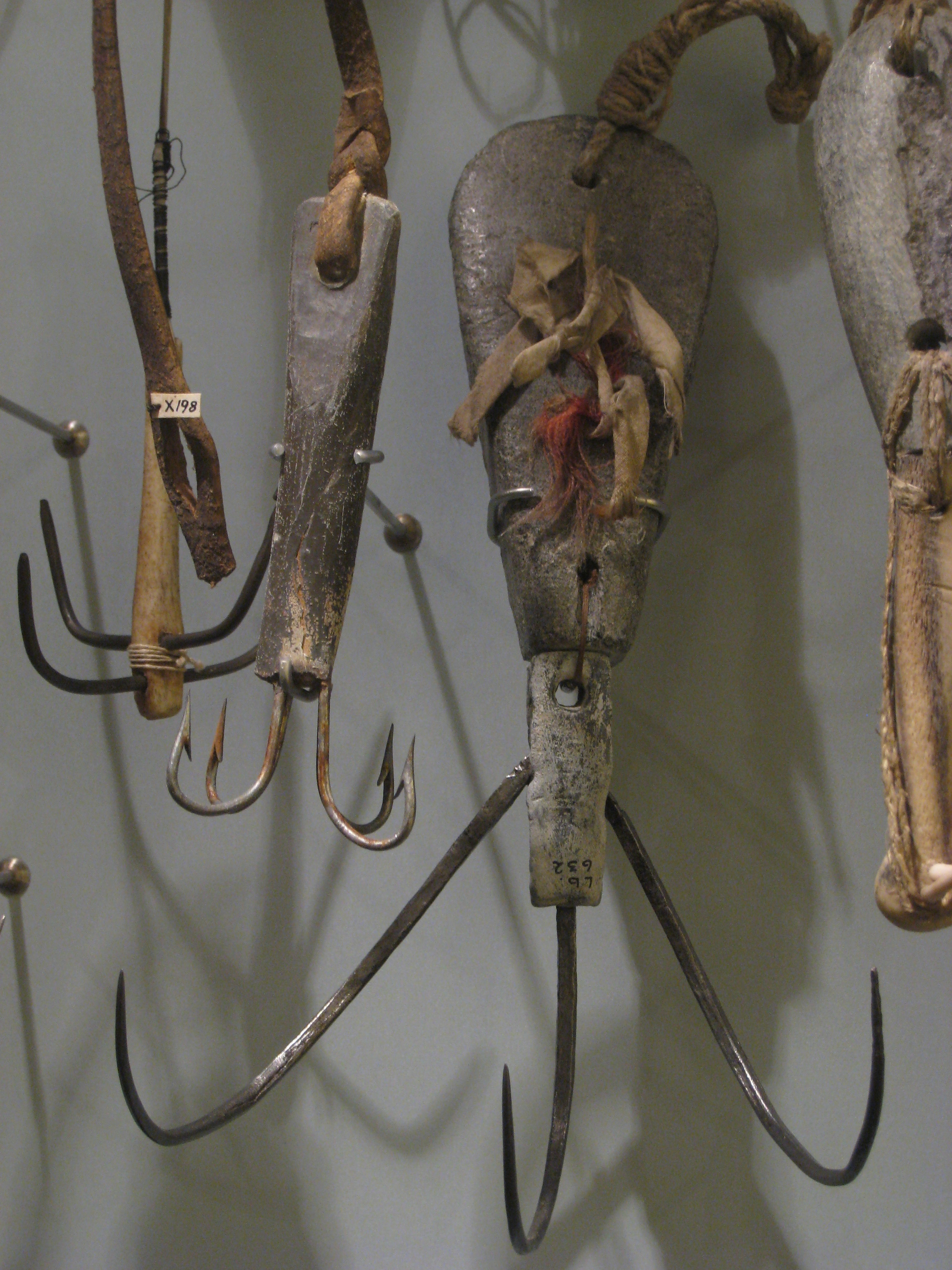
Inuit hooks used for ice fishing

The fishing industry in Greenland is very important to the national economy of Greenland and local food supply. It is the source of many people's livelihoods all across the country, employing some 6,500 out of a national population of 56,452 people (2010).

Fishing exports from Greenland in the past 20 years are accounted at about 90% of the country's total exports with international firms finding it a profitable business. Exports are mostly to the United States, Japan, Norway, Thailand, Germany, the United Kingdom, Iceland, and Denmark. The contribution of fishing industries to the economy of Greenland as a whole is estimated to be more than 50%; contribution to gross national income of the country is reported to be as high as 20%.

The fish that dominate the Greenlandic fishing industry are mainly shrimp, cod, halibut and salmon. They are caught and processed in Greenland and then are sold, often exported in frozen cans. The center of the fishing industry lies in the south of the country, the main hub is in Disko Bay in the southwest.

== History ==
Greenland's entry into the market of European Union was in 1972. This was considered as harmful to the interests of Greenland, and eventually, based on a referendum, in 1985 this was replaced with five year agreements with the EU.

Although in the 1970s and early 1980s the halibut industry in Greenland was low scale, it has since dramatically increased since the 1980s and in the future may develop into a purely commercial venture for many native people in the country.

Although the industry grew dramatically in the 1990s, by 2000 depletion of stocks resulted in falling revenues and the closure of many fishing plants. This problem continued into 2002. In 2000, Greenland renewed its agreement with the European Union in which along with Denmark relies on subsidies to support the growth of the industry and in return Greenlandic fish is openly sold in Europeans markets, boosting the economy.

On March 7, 1992, Greenland made an agreement with Russia over fishing exploitation in their waters and in 2010 made new negotiations in Saint Petersburg. The agreement was that Greenland would be permitted to fish for cod and haddock in the Barents Sea, while Russia would be permitted to fish for redfish and Greenland halibut in East and West Greenland. Estimates are that in 2011 Russia would fish some 750 tonnes of redfish in Greenlandic waters.

== Production ==
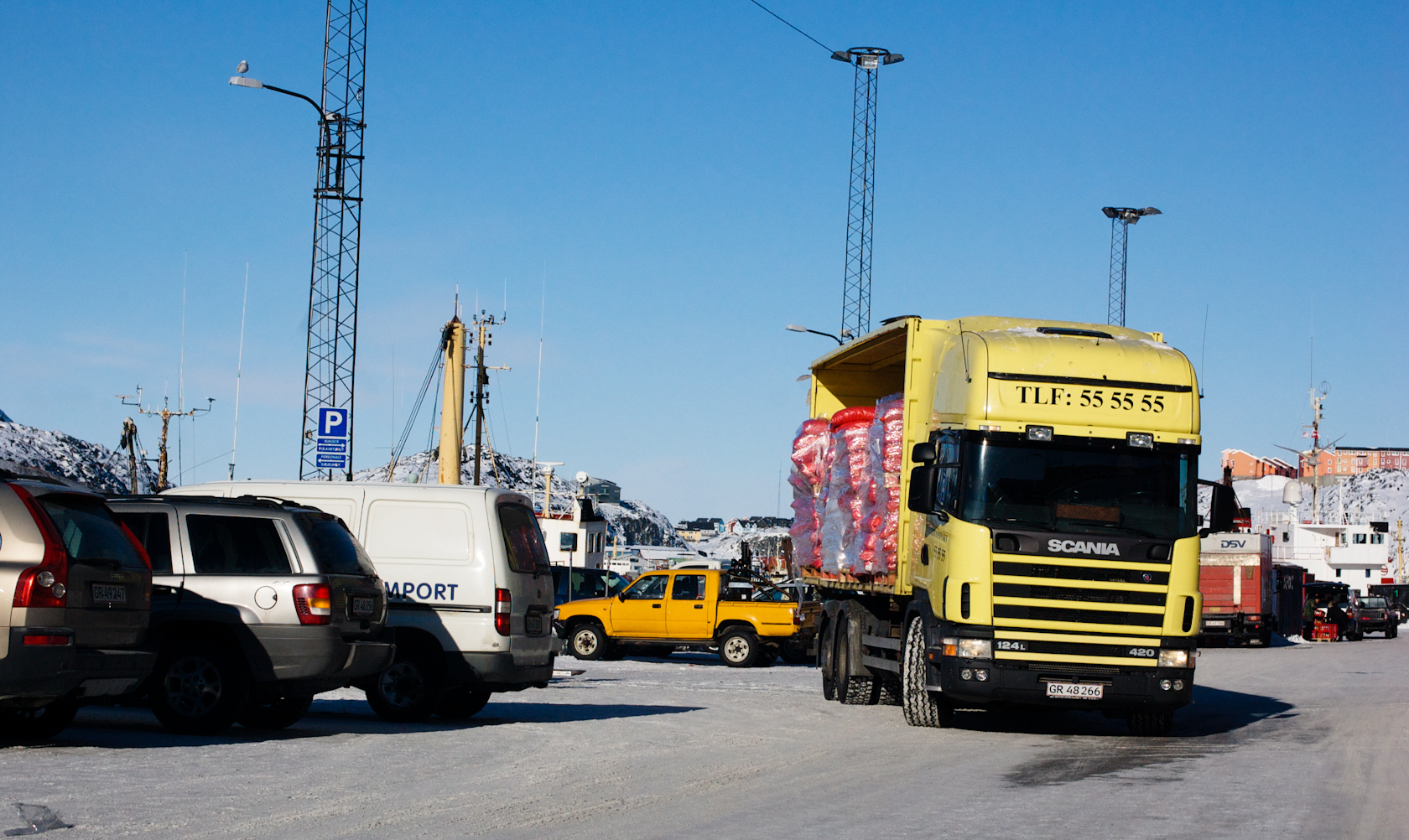

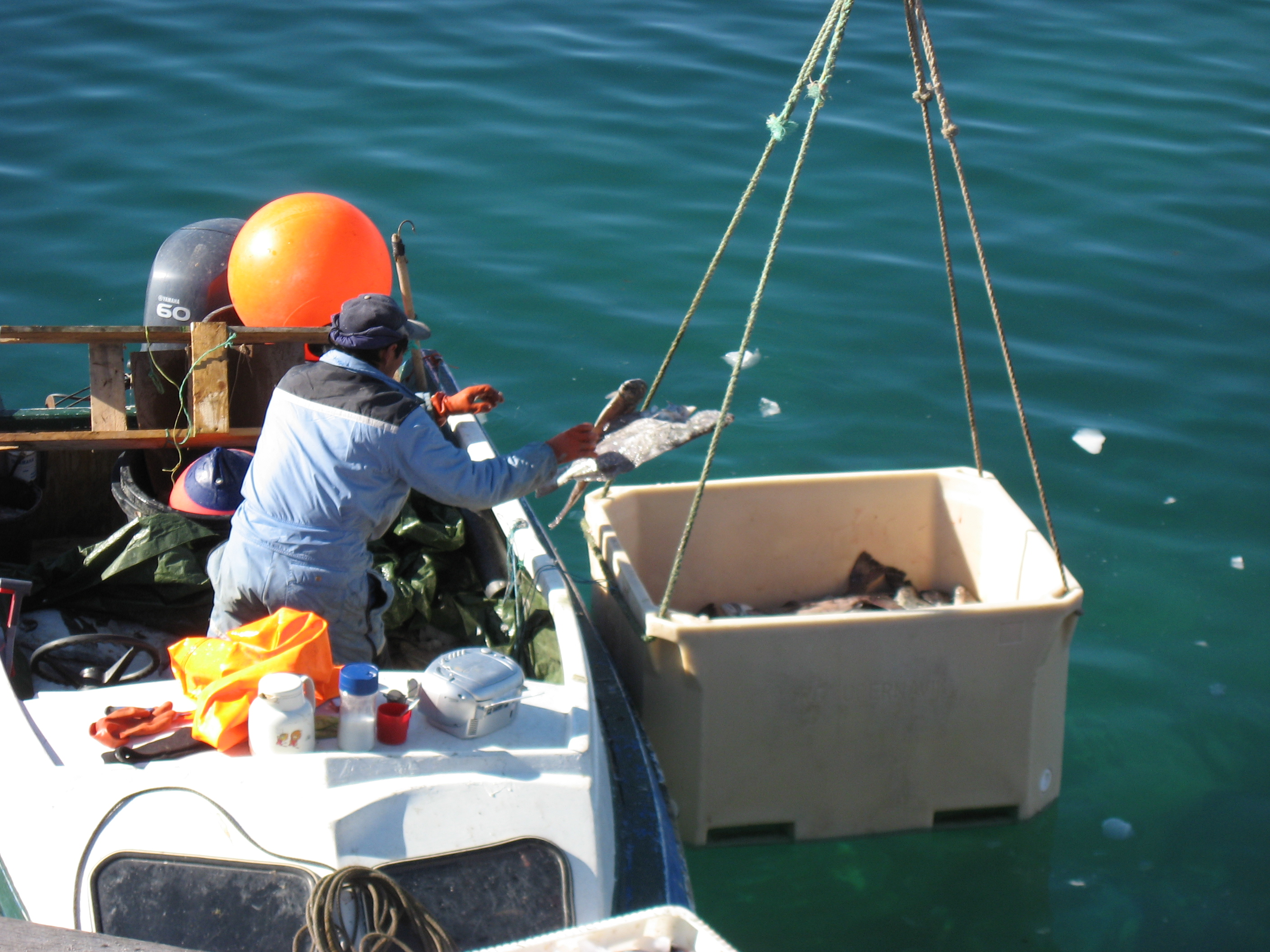
Long-line fisher in Aappilattoq, Avannaata unloading his catch of halibut.

Fishing operation during the 1990s was pursued by 150 vessels (both international and chartered) which resulted in an average production of 188,500 tonnes in the period between 1988 and 1995. The Royal Greenland of the government of Greenland manages most of the fishing industry. Royal Greenland alone has more than 10 processing factories on the island. It also has 15 smaller plants, apart from plants in Denmark and Germany. Its six fishing trawlers catch mostly shrimp and prawns.

According to statistical reports published in 2010, fish processing is the main industry of Greenland; mainly of shrimp and halibut with exports of fish and fish products accounting for 88%, with prawns contributing a major share of 54%. 93% of exports is to EU (mostly Denmark), 4% to other European countries and the balance to North America. A longstanding priority of the government is increasing American purchases of its fish.

Greenland has legislated laws related to fisheries imposing quota limits on fishing of prawns and halibut. Laws are enforced on the basis of biological advice to ensure sustenance of its natural resources. The limits imposed, on a year-to-year basis, on fisheries in Greenlandic waters by Greenlandic vessels are: Total shell fish comprising Islandic scallop, Northern prawn and Snow crab was 138,000 tonnes in 2008; total fish comprising species of Atlantic cod, Atlantic halibut, capelin, catfishes, chars, Greenland cod, Greenland halibut, Greenland shark, lumpsucker, redfish in 2008 was 76,100 tonnes; seal hunting was pegged at 159,661 number of seals, namely harbour seal, bearded seal, harp seal over 4 years old, harp seal under 4 years, hooded seal, ringed seal and walrus. Whaling was limited in 2007 at 3821 individuals of beluga whale, fin whale, killer whale, minke whale, narwhal, pilot whale and porpoise whale.

The exports statistics of various types of fishes in 2009 in tons are: prawns 64,256; cod 8,998; Greenland halibut 20,831, scallops 121; crab 1,380; lumpsucker spawn 776; other fish 7,780; other fish products 760; and seal, whale and shark 15.

Fish Types in Greenland

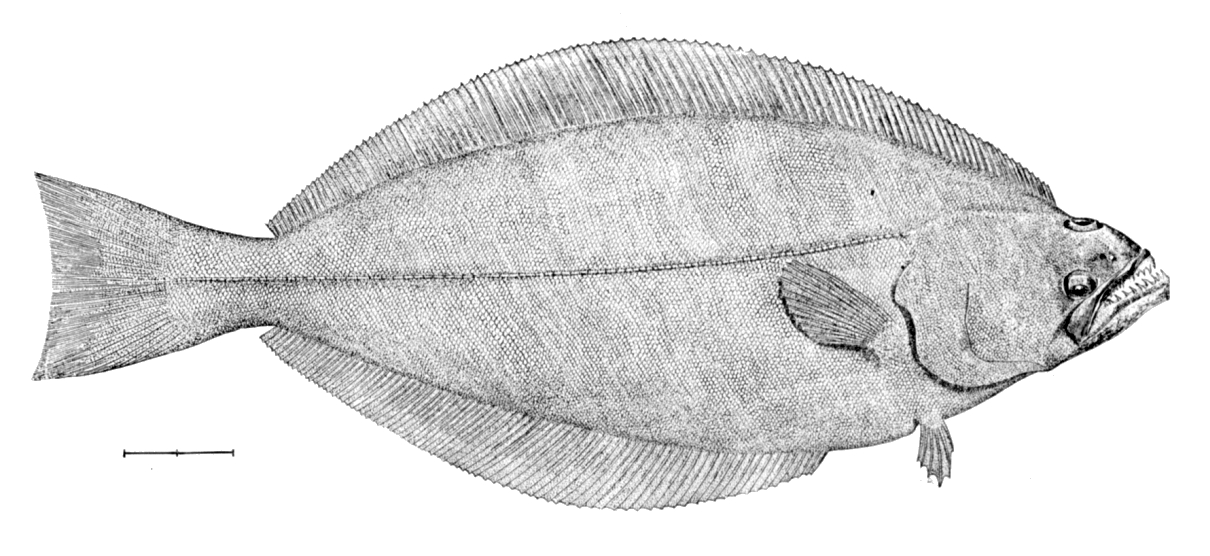
Greenland halibut

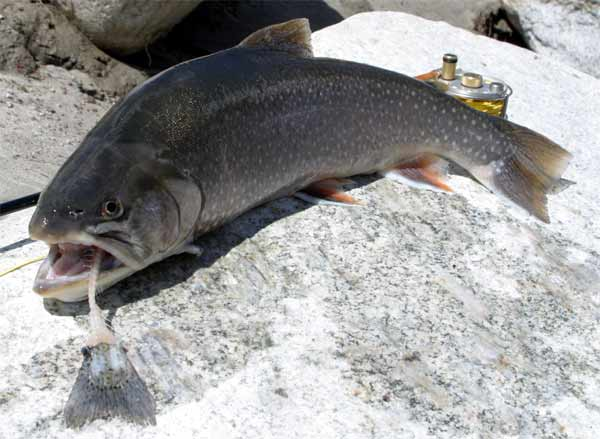
Arctic char

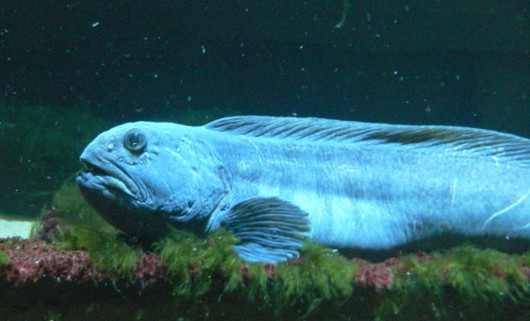
Seawolf

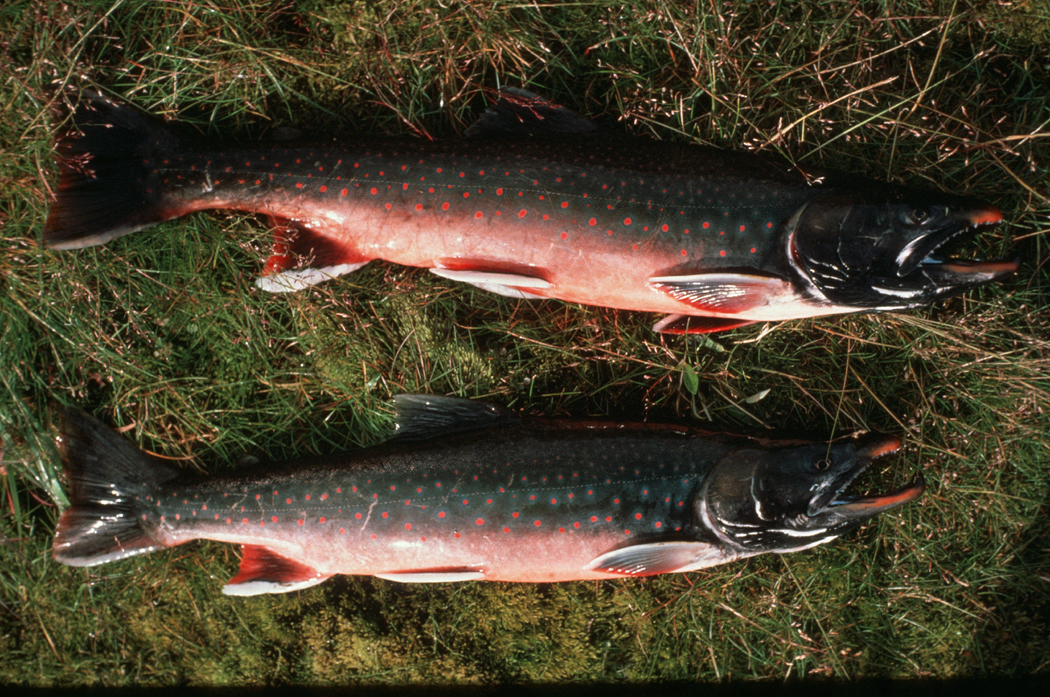
Salmon

== Economy ==
Fishing is Greenland's largest private industry. The island's economy is highly dependent on the fishing industry; contribution to its economy in 2000 was reported as 25% of gross national income and 23-30% of the economy. The sparsely populated villages along the coast, with about 150 inhabitants in each village, are entirely dependent on marine resources of fishing and hunting.

Export is dominated by the halibut species of fish to the extent of 56% while other species make up the balance. EU gives grants to Greenland amounting to DKK 320 million which is tied to fishing rights in Greenland. However, Greenland gets total exemption of duty on its exports to the EU, which generates an income of DKK 200 million.

The important production sector of Greenland at some stage accounted between 80 and 90% of exports. After export of zinc and copper stopped in 1990, exports registered a high of 90% in 2000, valued at US$250 million out of a total export value of about US$285 million.
