= 1979 European Parliament election in Denmark =

7–10 June 1979	1984 →

16 seats in the European Parliament

European Parliament elections were held in Denmark between 7 and 10 June 1979 to elect the 15 Danish members of the European Parliament. Elections were held separately in Greenland to elect one Greenlandic member.

== Results ==
Party	Votes	%	Seats
Social Democrats	382,487	21.92	3
People's Movement against the EEC	365,760	20.96	4
Venstre	252,767	14.48	3
Conservative People's Party	245,309	14.06	2
Centre Democrats	107,790	6.18	1
Progress Party	100,702	5.77	1
Socialist People's Party	81,991	4.70	1
Left Socialists	60,964	3.49	0
Justice Party of Denmark	59,379	3.40	0
Danish Social Liberal Party	56,944	3.26	0
Christian People's Party	30,985	1.78	0
Total	1,745,078	100.00	15
Valid votes	1,745,078	97.96	
Invalid/blank votes	36,426	2.04	
Total votes	1,781,504	100.00	
Registered voters/turnout	3,725,235	47.82	
Source: Folketingsårbog

=== Seat apportionment ===
Main apportionment
Letter	Electoral alliance/party outside of electoral alliance	Votes	Quotients	Seats
A	Social Democrats	382,487	3.82	3
B	Danish Social Liberal Party	56,944	0.57	0
CMQV	Conservative People's Party/Centre Democrats/Christian People's Party/Venstre	636,851	6.37	6
EFNY	Justice Party/Socialist People's Party/People's Movement against the EEC/Left Socialists	568,094	5.68	5
Z	Progress Party	100,702	1.01	1
Divisor: 100,000

Alliance 1
Letter	Party	Votes	Quotients	Seats
C	Conservative People's Party	245,309	2.96	2
M	Centre Democrats	107,790	1.30	1
Q	Christian People's Party	30,985	0.37	0
V	Venstre	252,767	3.05	3
Divisor: 83,000

Alliance 2
Letter	Party	Votes	Quotients	Seats
E	Justice Party	59,379	0.74	0
F	Socialist People's Party	81,991	1.02	1
N	People's Movement against the EEC	365,760	4.57	4
Y	Left Socialists	60,964	0.76	0
Divisor: 80,000
