= Redfish =

Redfish is a common name for several species of fish. It is most commonly applied to certain deep-sea rockfish in the genus Sebastes, red drum from the genus Sciaenops or the reef dwelling snappers in the genus Lutjanus. It is also applied to the slimeheads or roughies (family Trachichthyidae), and the alfonsinos (Berycidae).

Species known as "Redfish"
Image	Species	Other common names
	Centroberyx affinis	Redfish, eastern nannygai
	Etelis oculatus	Queen snapper
	Lutjanus buccanella	Blackfin snapper
	Lutjanus campechanus	Red snapper
	Lutjanus erythropterus	Crimson snapper
	Lutjanus malabaricus	Malabar blood snapper
	Lutjanus purpureus	Southern red snapper
	Lutjanus sebae	Emperor red snapper
	Lutjanus synagris	Lane snapper
	Oncorhynchus nerka	Sockeye salmon
	Rhomboplites aurorubens	Vermillion snapper
	Sebastes fasciatus	Acadian redfish
	Sciaenops ocellatus	Red drum
	Sebastes mentella	Deep-water redfish
	Sebastes norvegicus	Ocean perch, rose fish
	Sebastes viviparus	Norway redfish
