= Nannygai =

Nannygai is the name of various fish from the Australian region:

- In family Lutjanidae:
  - Malabar blood snapper, Lutjanus malabaricus.
  - Crimson snapper, Lutjanus erythropterus.
- In family Berycidae:
  - Eastern nannygai, Centroberyx affinis.
  - Yelloweye nannygai, Centroberyx australis.
- Family Glaucosomatidae:
  - Pearl perch, Glaucosoma scapulare.
