= Red snapper =

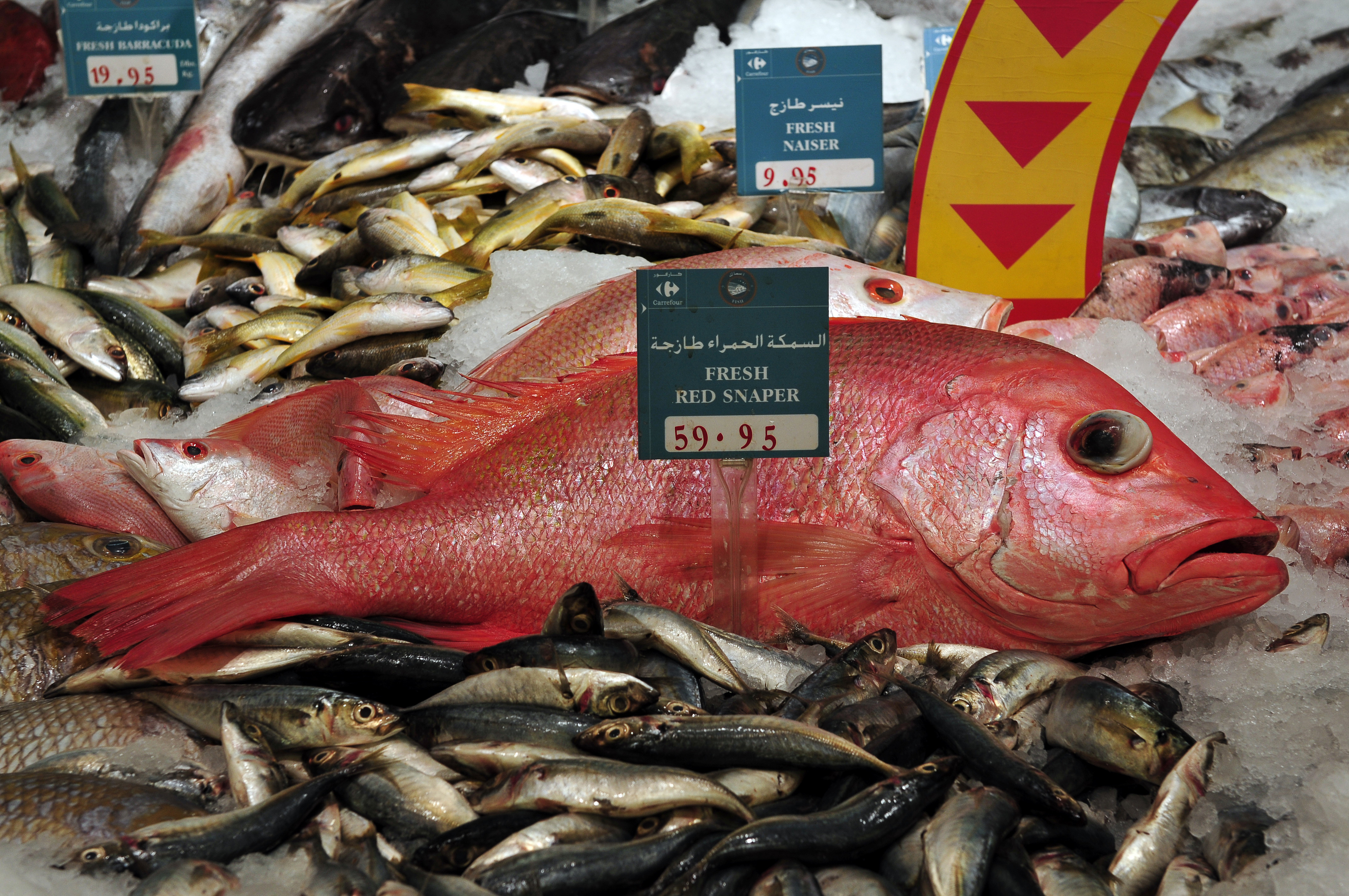

Red snapper is a common name of several fish species. It may refer to:

- Several species from the genus Lutjanus:
  - Lutjanus campechanus, Northern red snapper, commonly referred to as red snapper in the Gulf of Mexico and western Atlantic Ocean
  - Lutjanus purpureus, Southern red snapper, is one of several Lutjanus species called red snapper (or by the name huachinango in Mexico) or pargo in South America
  - Red snappers from Southeast Asian waters may be Lutjanus species such as Lutjanus argentimaculatus, Lutjanus gibbus, Lutjanus malabaricus and Lutjanus sebae
- Several species from the genus Sebastes:
  - Sebastes miniatus
  - Sebastes ruberrimus, commonly referred to as red snapper along the Pacific coast of North America
- Several species from the genus Centroberyx:
  - Centroberyx affinis, commonly referred to as red snapper in New Zealand
  - Centroberyx gerrardi, one of several species commonly referred to as red snapper in Australia
- Etelis coruscans, long tail red snapper, commonly referred to as onaga in Hawaii
- Pagrus major, referred to as red snapper in English in contexts concerning Japanese regional cuisine
