= ZBED11 =

Human gene

Identifiers
- Aliases: ZBED11, family with sequence similarity 200 member B, C4orf53, FAM200B, zinc finger BED-type containing 11
- External IDs: GeneCards: ZBED11

Gene location (Human)
Chr.	Chromosome 4 (human)
Band	4p15.32	Start	15,681,662 bp
Band	4p15.32	End	15,705,565 bp
RNA expression pattern
Bgee	Human / Mouse (ortholog); Top expressed in: monocyte; C1 segment; sperm; anterior pituitary; Achilles tendon; ganglionic eminence; nucleus accumbens; putamen; caudate nucleus; cingulate gyrus / n/a; More reference expression data
BioGPS	n/a
Gene ontology
Molecular function	DNA-binding transcription factor activity, RNA polymerase II-specific; DNA binding
Cellular component	cytoplasm; nucleoplasm
Biological process	regulation of transcription by RNA polymerase II
Sources:Amigo / QuickGO
Orthologs
Databases	NCBI: entry; OMA: entry
Species	Human	Mouse
Entrez	285550	n/a
Ensembl	ENSG00000237765	n/a
UniProt	P0CF97	n/a
RefSeq (mRNA)	NM_001145191	n/a
RefSeq (protein)	NP_001138663	n/a
Location (UCSC)	Chr 4: 15.68 – 15.71 Mb	n/a
PubMed search		n/a
- Wikidata
View/Edit Human

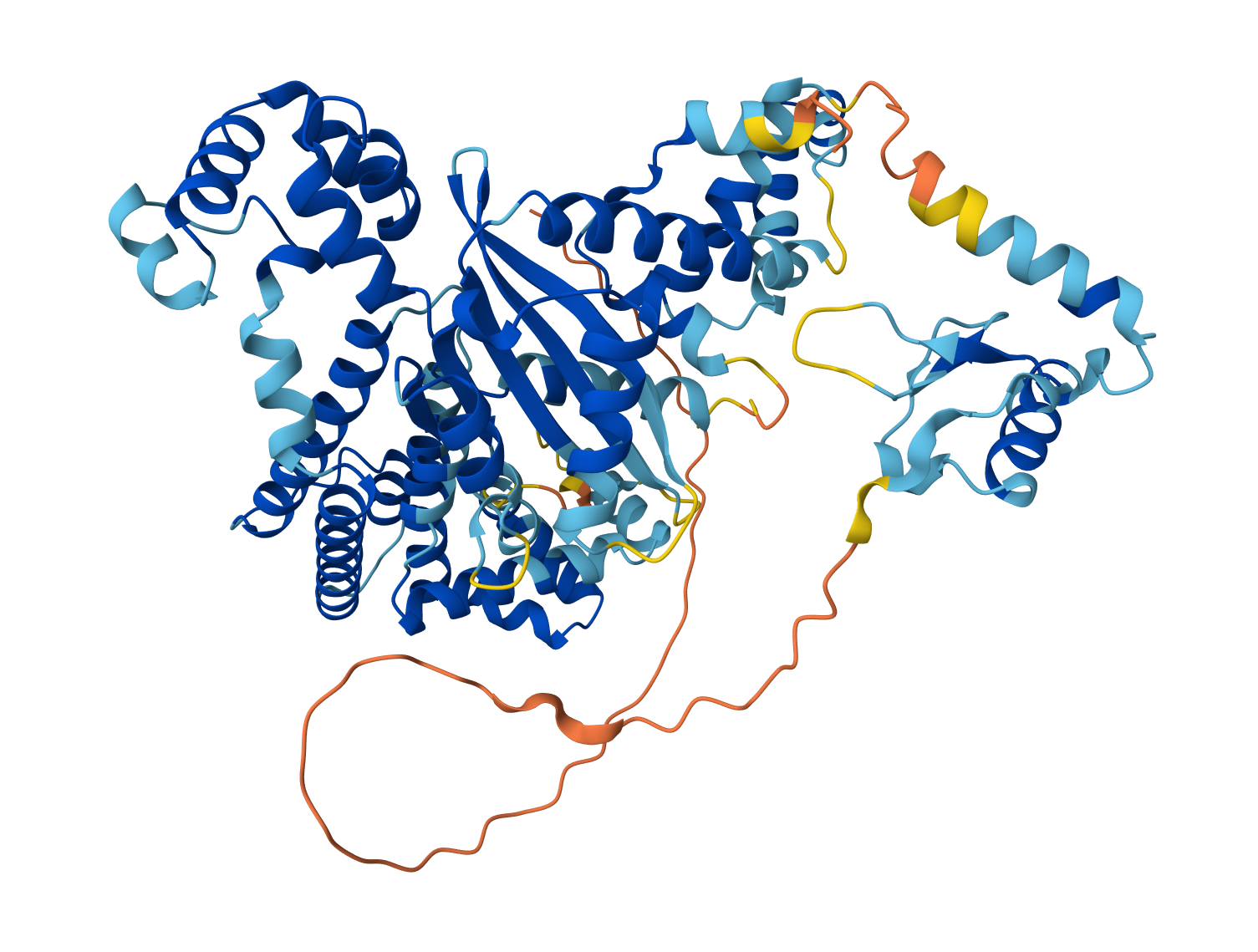
Fig. 1: Predicted tertiary FAM200B protein structure.

FAM200B (Family with sequence similarity 200 member B), is a protein which in humans is encoded by the FAM200B gene.The gene encodes a 657 amino acid protein. The FAM200B protein is a large intracellular protein with no well defined functional domains. Structural data states there is no experimentally proven structures available, however predicted tertiary structures are available. Expression data states FAM200B is expressed moderately and ubiquitously in all tissues, with relatively higher expression in the brain and thymus. Although its function remains unknown, predicted nuclear localization and expression patterns suggest that FAM200B may be involved in regulatory processes such as gene expression or protein protein interactions.

== Gene ==
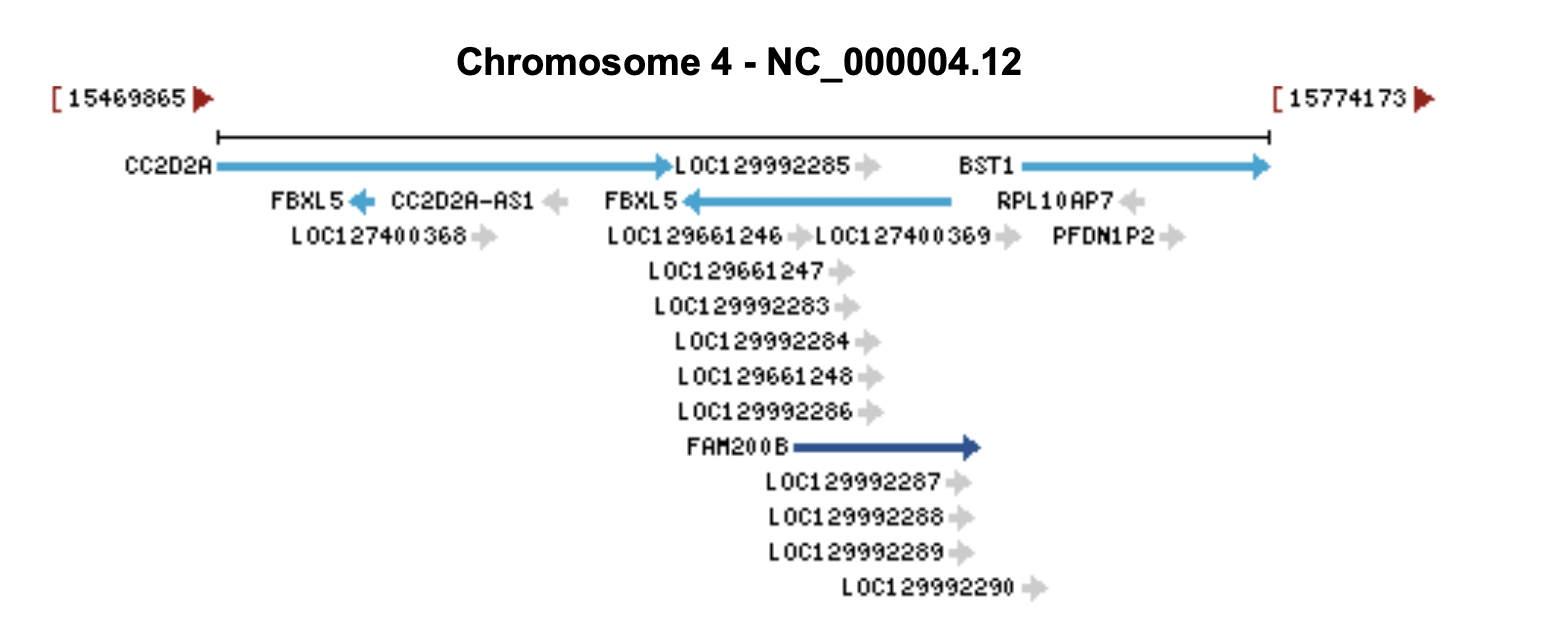
Fig. 2: FAM200B in its neighborhood on Chromosome 4.

FAM200B also known as C4orf54, is a protein coding gene located on chromosome 4p15.32. The gene spans 4,287 nucleotides and contains two exons. This gene has multiple transcript variants that encode for two protein isoforms.

== Transcripts ==
The canonical FAM200B transcript is NM_001145191.2, which spans approximately 4.3 kb and consists of two exons with the second exon (bases 76–4287) comprising nearly the entire coding sequence. There are multiple transcript variants for FAM200B, that encodes for two protein isoforms. See table 1.

Table 1: Transcript and protein isoforms of the human FAM200B gene.

Transcript	Length (nt)	Protein	Length (aa)	Isoform
NM_001145191.2	4,287	NP_001138663.1	657	MANE Select
XM_017008048.2	4,397	XP_016863537.1	657	X1
XM_024453999.2	3,822	XP_024309767.1	657	X1
XM_024454000.2	3,818	XP_024309768.1	657	X1
XM_024454001.2	3,942	XP_024309769.1	657	X1
XM_024454003.2	3,938	XP_024309771.1	657	X1
XM_024454005.2	3,803	XP_024309773.1	657	X1
XM_024454006.2	3,799	XP_024309774.1	657	X1
XM_024454008.2	3,749	XP_024309776.1	480	X2
XM_024454009.2	3,869	XP_024309777.1	480	X2
XM_024454010.2	3,979	XP_024309778.1	480	X2
XM_024454011.2	3,730	XP_024309779.1	480	X2
XM_047450103.1	4,464	XP_047306059.1	657	X1
XM_047450104.1	4,517	XP_047306060.1	657	X1
XM_047450106.1	4,342	XP_047306062.1	657	X1
XM_047450107.1	4,378	XP_047306063.1	657	X1
XM_047450108.1	3,889	XP_047306064.1	657	X1
XM_047450109.1	3,885	XP_047306065.1	657	X1
XM_047450110.1	4,480	XP_047306066.1	657	X1
XM_047450112.1	4,840	XP_047306068.1	657	X1
XM_047450113.1	3,816	XP_047306069.1	480	X2
XM_047450114.1	3,926	XP_047306070.1	480	X2
XM_047450115.1	3,859	XP_047306071.1	480	X2
XM_047450117.1	3,804	XP_047306073.1	480	X2
XM_054349762.1	4,559	XP_054205737.1	657	X1
XM_054349763.1	4,612	XP_054205738.1	657	X1
XM_054349764.1	4,394	XP_054205739.1	657	X1
XM_054349765.1	4,339	XP_054205740.1	657	X1
XM_054349766.1	4,375	XP_054205741.1	657	X1
XM_054349767.1	3,819	XP_054205742.1	657	X1
XM_054349768.1	3,815	XP_054205743.1	657	X1
XM_054349769.1	3,984	XP_054205744.1	657	X1
XM_054349770.1	3,980	XP_054205745.1	657	X1
XM_054349771.1	4,037	XP_054205746.1	657	X1
XM_054349772.1	4,033	XP_054205747.1	657	X1
XM_054349773.1	4,477	XP_054205748.1	657	X1
XM_054349774.1	4,837	XP_054205749.1	657	X1
XM_054349775.1	3,800	XP_054205750.1	657	X1
XM_054349776.1	3,796	XP_054205751.1	657	X1
XM_054349777.1	3,746	XP_054205752.1	480	X2
XM_054349778.1	3,911	XP_054205753.1	480	X2
XM_054349779.1	3,964	XP_054205754.1	480	X2
XM_054349780.1	4,074	XP_054205755.1	480	X2
XM_054349781.1	4,021	XP_054205756.1	480	X2
XM_054349782.1	3,856	XP_054205757.1	480	X2
XM_054349783.1	3,727	XP_054205758.1	480	X2
XM_054349784.1	3,801	XP_054205759.1	480	X2

== Protein ==
Human FAM200B encodes two protein isoforms, a longer 657 amino acid isoform (Isoform X1) and a shorter 480 amino acid isoform (Isoform X2), see Table 1. The canonical transcript is NM_001145191.2, while the remaining variants are predicted models. The predicted molecular weight is ~76.0 kDa and approximate pI is 8.33. Amino acid composition is enriched for Leu (~12.9%), Ser (~8.8%), Lys (~8.2%), and Glu (~8.1%). FAM200B lacks low complexity regions, long tandem repeats, or significant charge clusters, with charged residues distributed evenly throughout the sequence. Only short, localized periodic motifs were detected, consistent with a soluble intracellular protein lacking large repetitive domains. Although no experimentally validated domains have been defined, based on homology analyses across vertebrate ortho logs conserved C2H2- and BED type zinc finger motifs were identified in FAM200B. Secondary structure analysis predicts FAM200B is a mixture of α-helices and β-strands, concentrated in a conserved central region of the protein. Predicted tertiary structure suggest that FAM200B contains a mostly globular fold with a well structured core and more flexible N and C terminal regions.

== Gene level regulation ==
FAM200B is ubiquitously expressed moderately across human tissues and relatively higher expression in brain and thymus. Promoter analysis identified ETC and ETV5::FOXJ1 motif as high scoring transcription factor binding sites (with high scores of 511 and 436). Both transcription factors are known to function in neural development and brain related regulatory pathways, making them biologically plausible given the higher expression of FAM200B in brain tissue.

== Protein level regulation ==
FAM200B is a nuclear, soluble protein, with no signal peptide or transmembrane domains and no evidence of secretion or membrane insertion. Post translational modification predictions indicate multiple serine, threonine, and tyrosine phosphorylation sites and multiple SUMOylation sites, while no evidence for lipid anchor attachment, relevant glycosylation, or N terminal acetylation was identified.

== Homology ==
FAM200B is a vertebrate specific gene with the conserved paralog FAM200A, indicating a stable gene family structure across evolution. The two human para logs FAM200B and FAM200A have 79.79% sequence identity and both contain the conserved Domain of Unknown Function 4371 (DUF4371), supporting common evolutionary origin and functional similarity. Comparative genome analysis shows that FAM200B ortho logs are present throughout vertebrates, including mammals, birds, amphibians, and bony fishes, with no clear homologs detected in invertebrate lineages, suggesting emergence during early vertebrate evolution.

The earliest identifiable FAM200B ortho logs occur in A. ctinopterygii (ray-finned fish), indicating the gene originated prior to the divergence of bony fish and tetrapods approximately 420 - 450 million years ago. Across vertebrates, the number of family members has remained stable at two paralogs, although there are moderate differences observed in transcript length, exon composition, and alternative splicing patterns in distant orthologs. Despite this divergence, the overall sequence and conserved DUF4371 core are maintained.

Table 2: 20 orthologs of the FAM200B protein in organisms including mammals (34-100% identity), birds/ reptiles (25-37% identity), amphibians (35-38% identity) and bony fish (37-43% identity).

	Clade	Genus, Species	Common Name	Taxonomic Group	Divergence Date (MYA)	Accession Number	Query Cover	Sequnce Length (aa)	Sequence Identity (%)	Sequence Similarity (%)
	Mammalia	Homo Sapiens	Human	Primates	0	NP_001138663.1	100	657	100	100
1		Pan troglodytes	Chimpanzee	Apes	6.4	XP_001139775.1	100	573	99	99
2		Papio anubis	Olive baboon	Primates	28.8	XP_017814067.1	100	657	97	98
3		Canis lupus familiaris	Dog	Carnivora	94	XP_038335570.0	88	813	91	95
4		Monodelphis domestica	Gray short-tailed opossum	Marsupials	160	XP_056673701.1	75	748	34	54
5	Reptilia	Natator depressus	Flatback sea turtle	Testudines	319	XP_074809886.1	91	655	34	56
8		Chelonia mydas	Green sea turtle	Testudines	319	XP_043379535.1	98	624	34	57
6	Aves	Oxyura jamaicensis	Ruddy duck	Aves	319	XP_035169477.1	87	564	27	47
7		Caloenas nicobarica	Nicobar pigeon	Aves	319	XP_065484009.1	89	604	25	44
9	Amphibia	Pleurodeles waltl	Iberian ribbed newt	Urodela	352	XP_069075336.1	92	617	38	59
10		Dendrobates tinctorius	Poison dart frog	Anura	352	XP_073431629.1	89	625	38	59
11		Ascaphus truei	Tailed frog	Anura	352	XP_075472991.1	100	638	37	57
12		Rhinatrema bivittatum		Gymnophiona	352	XP_029452623.1	92	598	35	56
13	Osteichthyes	Trichomycterus rosablanca	Cave catfish	Siluriformes	426	XP_062844886.1	91	614	43	64
14		Astyanax mexicanus	Mexican tetra	Characiformes	429	XP_049334409.1	91	598	42	64
15		Anoplopoma fimbria	Sablefish	Scorpaeniformes	429	XP_054473507.1	85	552	42	64
16		Eleginops maclovinus	Patagonian bennie	Perciformes	429	: XP_063763934.1	99	692	38	59
17		Centroberyx gerrardi	Bright redfish	Eryciformes	429	XP_071783535.1	91	544	38	58
18		Carassius auratus	Goldfish	Cypriniformes	429	XP_026126532.1	95	633	37	58
19		Triplophysa rosa		Cypriniformes	429	XP_057204124.1	94	633	39	59
20		Megalobrama amblycephala	Wuchang bream	Cypriniformes	429	XP_048064547.1	85	551	42	63

== Function ==
FAM200B encodes a conserved intracellular protein with an unknown function. Sequence and structural analyses indicate that FAM200B lacks catalytic motifs, signal peptides, and transmembrane domains. This suggests it does not function as an enzyme, secreted factor, or membrane protein. It's predicted nuclear localization, the presence of regulatory post translational modification sites (including phosphorylation and SUMOylation), and limited zinc finger like motifs support a role in regulatory processes, possibly involving protein protein interactions.

== Interacting proteins ==
Interaction analysis identified limited biologically plausible binding partners for FAM200B, most notably ANKRD45 and C1orf198. ANKRD45 contains ankyrin repeat domains that mediate protein protein interactions, supporting a role for FAM200B within regulatory complexes, while C1orf198 is an uncharacterized protein associated with nuclear and regulatory proteins, suggesting a protein complex relationship. Other predicted partners lack compatible localization or functional context. This indicates that FAM200B likely interacts as a nuclear regulatory protein that functions through protein - protein interactions within a protein complex.

== Clinical significance ==
FAM200B has no established association with human disease, and no pathogenic variants. However expression under specific cellular stressors, suggests that FAM200B may function as a modifier gene influencing strength, timing, or cellular context of disease related pathways.
