= Red Jew =

Red Jew may refer to:

- Red Jews, a myth circulated in medieval Germany
- Crimson snapper, Lutjanus erythropterus, a fish
- Malabar blood snapper, Lutjanus malabaricus, a fish
- The Red Jew, a 1915 painting by Marc Chagall

== See also ==
- Jewish Bolshevism
- Jewish socialism
