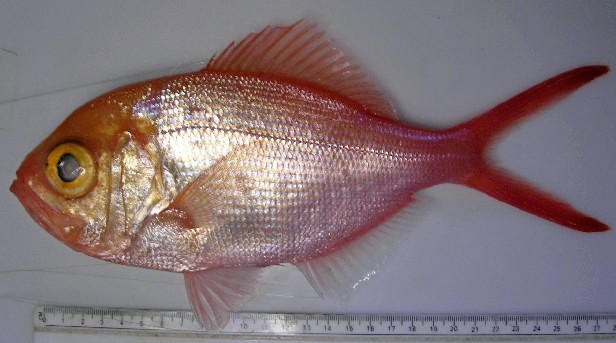

Scientific classification
- Kingdom: Animalia
- Phylum: Chordata
- Class: Actinopterygii
- Order: Beryciformes
- Family: Berycidae
- Genus: Centroberyx
- Species: C. druzhinini

Binomial name
- Centroberyx druzhinini (Busakhin, 1981)

Synonyms
- Trachichthodes druzhinini Busakhin, 1981; Centroberyx gerrardi (non Günther, 1887)

= Centroberyx druzhinini =

Species of fish

Centroberyx druzhinini is a member of the family Berycidae found in the Western Indian Ocean and Western Pacific Ocean near Japan and New Caledonia. It can reach sizes of up to 23.0 centimetres (9.1 in) TL and lives at depths between 128 and 200 metres (420 and 656 ft).
