= Centroberyx spinosus =

Scientific classification
- Kingdom: Animalia
- Phylum: Chordata
- Class: Actinopterygii
- Order: Beryciformes
- Family: Berycidae
- Genus: Centroberyx
- Species: C. spinosus

Binomial name
- Centroberyx spinosus (Gilchrist, 1903)

Species of fish

Centroberyx spinosus, the short alfonsino, is a species of ray-finned fish. It is found from the Storms River to off the coast of Durban, South Africa. Its head and body are reddish and it grows to 20 centimetres (7.9 in).
