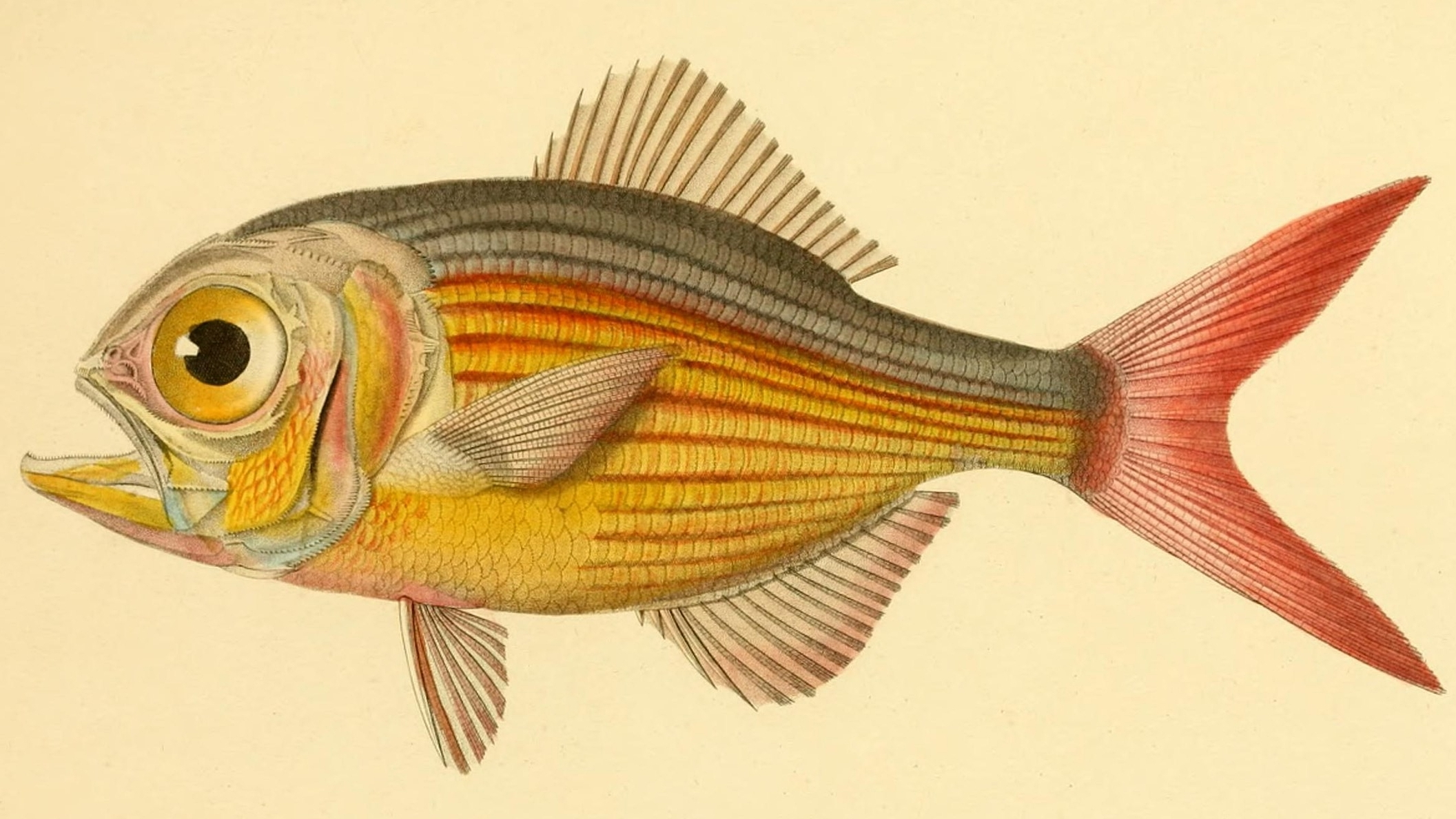

Scientific classification
- Kingdom: Animalia
- Phylum: Chordata
- Class: Actinopterygii
- Order: Beryciformes
- Family: Berycidae
- Genus: Centroberyx
- Species: C. lineatus

Binomial name
- Centroberyx lineatus (Cuvier, 1829)

Synonyms
- Beryx lineatus Cuvier, 1829; Trachichthodes lineatus (Cuvier, 1829)

= Centroberyx lineatus =

Swallow-tail

Species of fish

The swallow-tail or kingfish (Centroberyx lineatus) is a member of the family Berycidae. It is native to the Indian Ocean and Western Pacific Ocean off of Madagascar and from Australia to Japan. It can reach sizes of up to 46.0 centimetres (18.1 in) TL. It can be found on the continental shelf and continental slope around rocky reefs anywhere from 15 to 280 metres (49 to 919 ft) deep.
