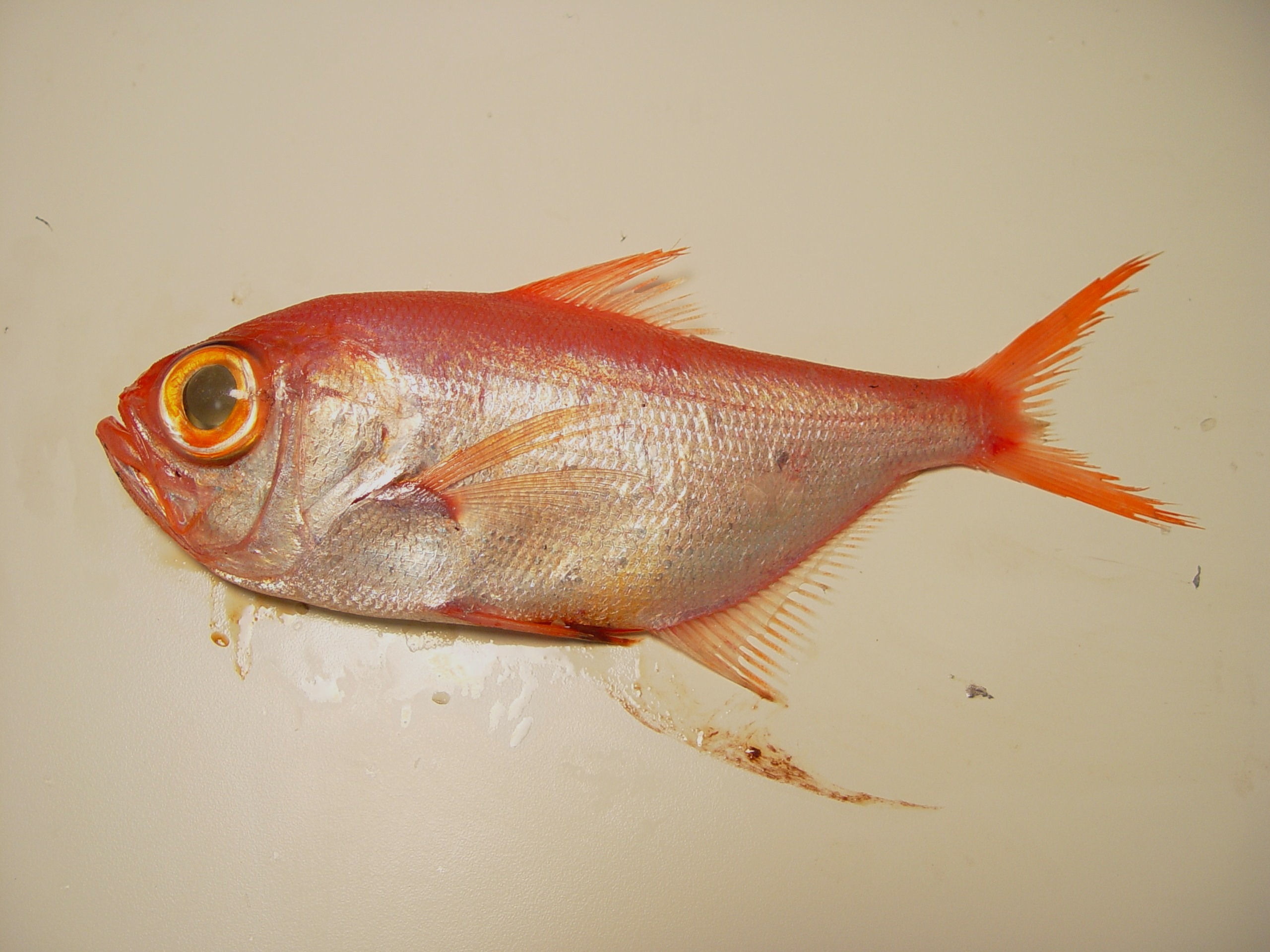

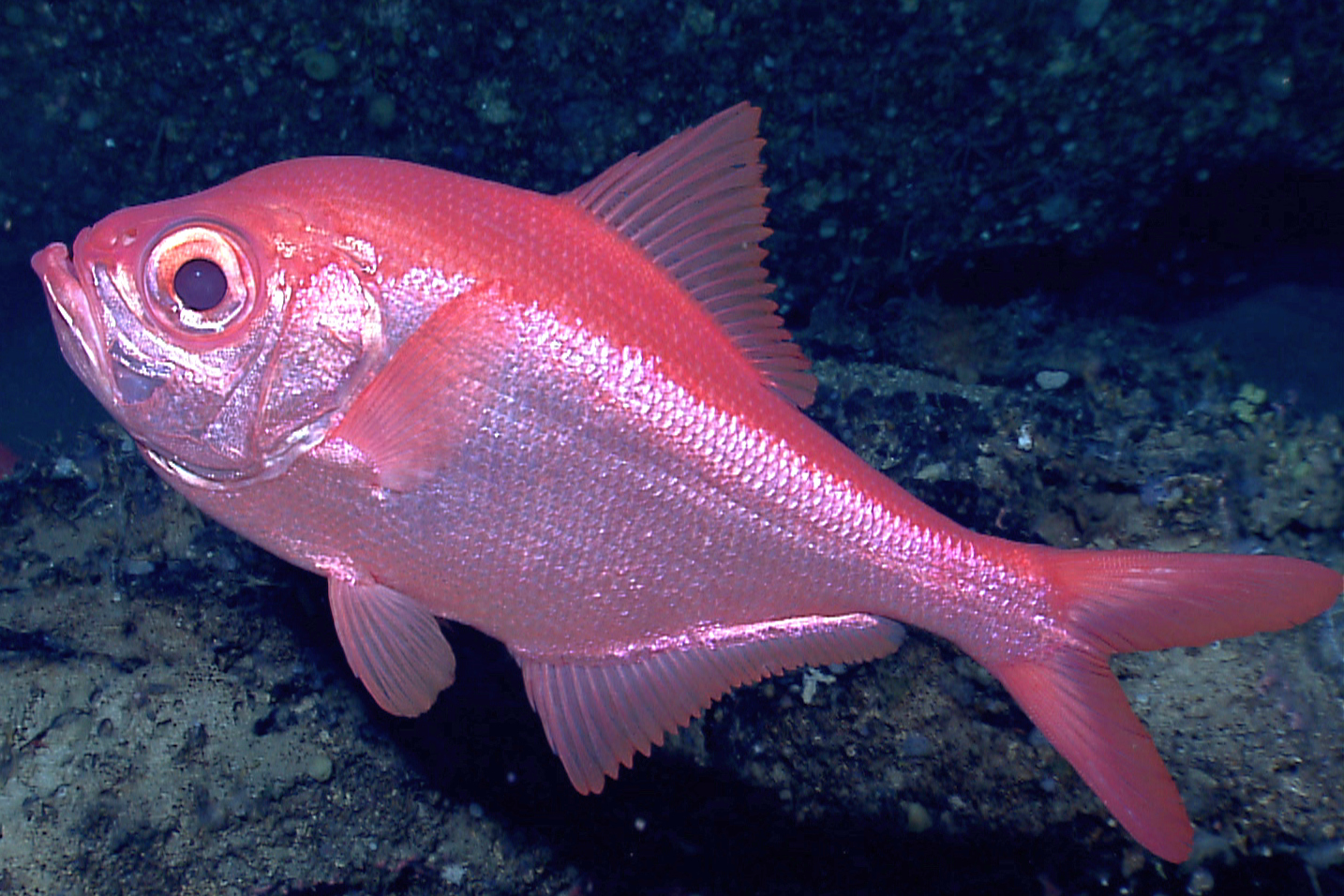

Conservation status
- Least Concern (IUCN 3.1)

Scientific classification
- Kingdom: Animalia
- Phylum: Chordata
- Class: Actinopterygii
- Order: Beryciformes
- Family: Berycidae
- Genus: Beryx
- Species: B. splendens

Binomial name
- Beryx splendens R. T. Lowe, 1834

= Splendid alfonsino =

Species of fish

The splendid alfonsino (Beryx splendens) is an alfonsino of the genus Beryx, found around the world at depths between 25 and 1,250 metres (82 and 4,101 ft), usually between 400 and 600 metres (1,300 and 2,000 ft). Although its most common size is 40 centimetres (16 in), it can reach lengths of up to 70 centimetres (28 in). It is known as kinmedai (金目鯛) or "golden eye snapper" in sushi and Japanese cuisine.

Served at traditional Edomae sushi restaurants, this fish is usually aged for 2 to 3 days after being dispatched using the ikejime technique. The ageing allows the fish's natural enzymes to break down the proteins in the flesh, increasing the flavour and texture of the fish. It is usually served with its skin lightly blowtorched, grilled under a charcoal grill or lightly blanched using a technique called kawashimo-zukuri (皮霜造り/かわしもづくり).

== Gallery ==
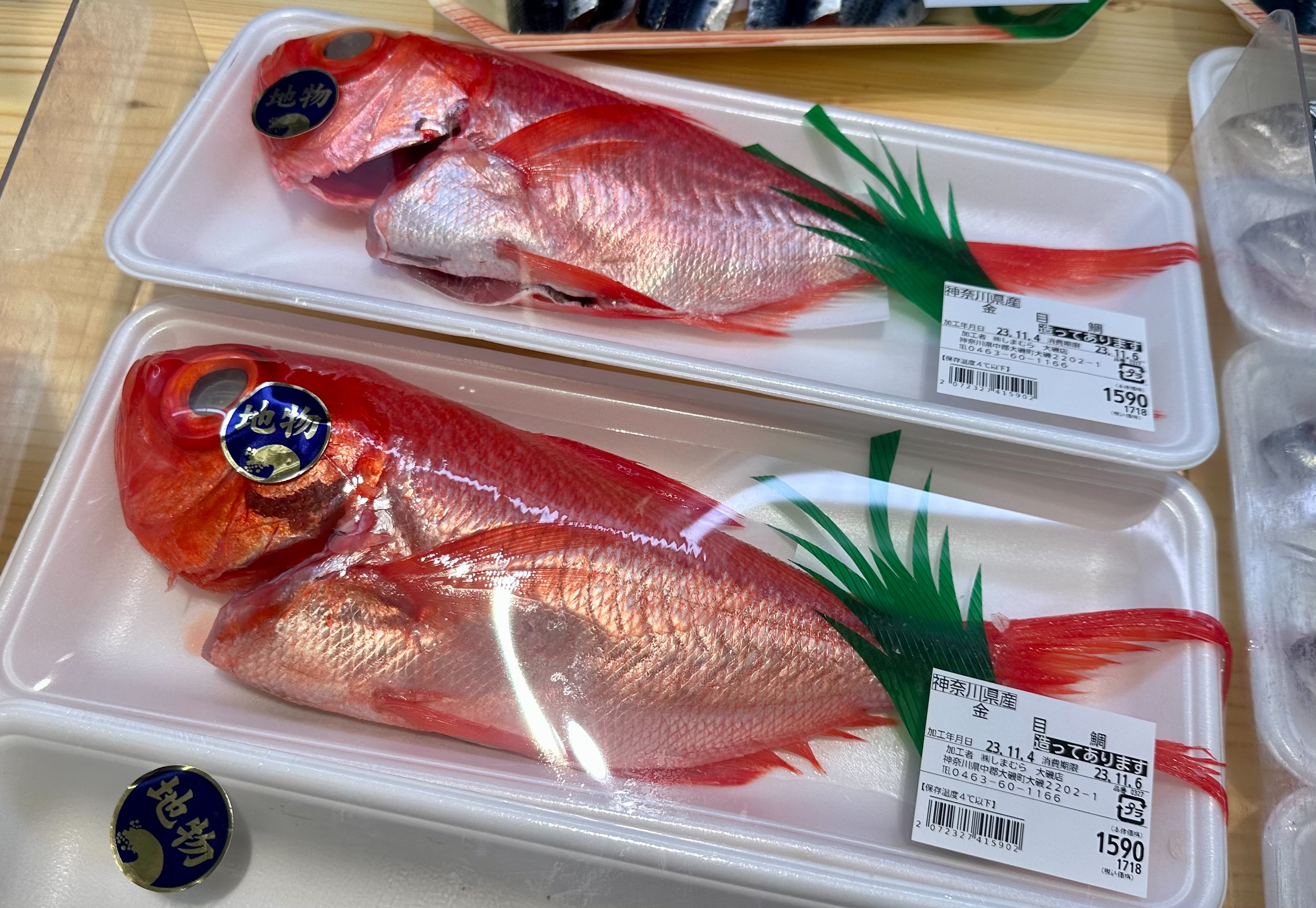
Sold in Kanagawa, Japan

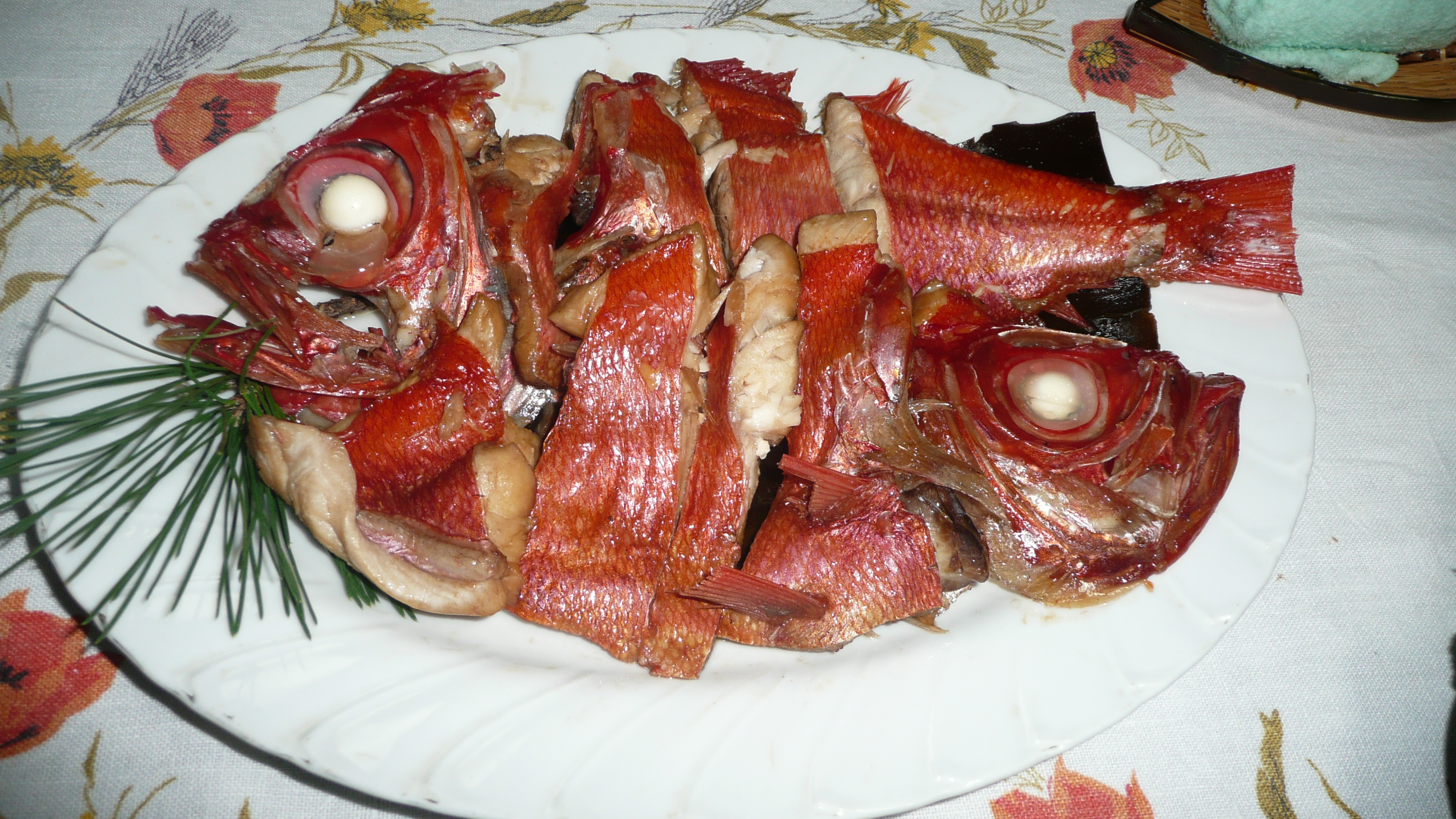
Boiled kinmedai from Japan

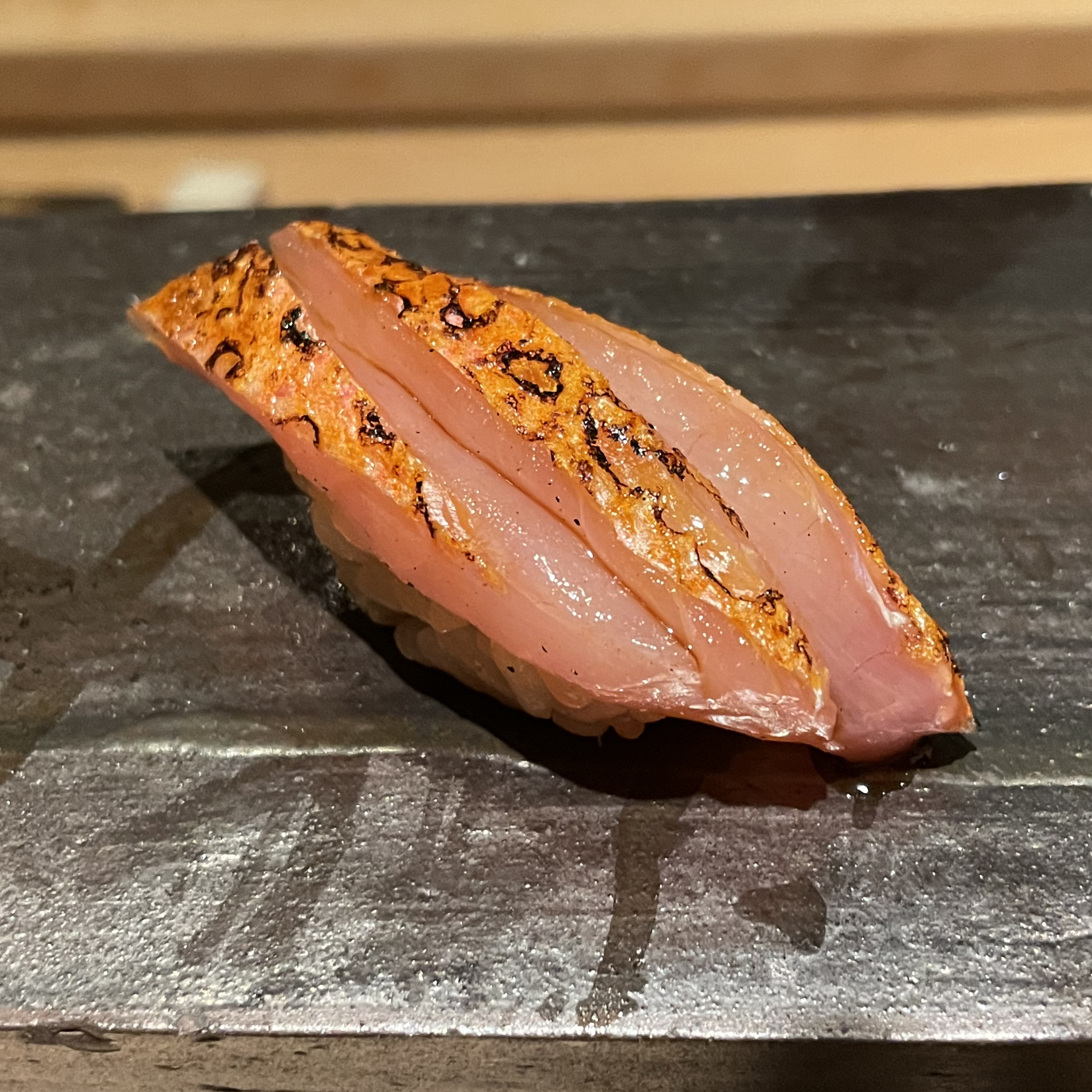
Sushi

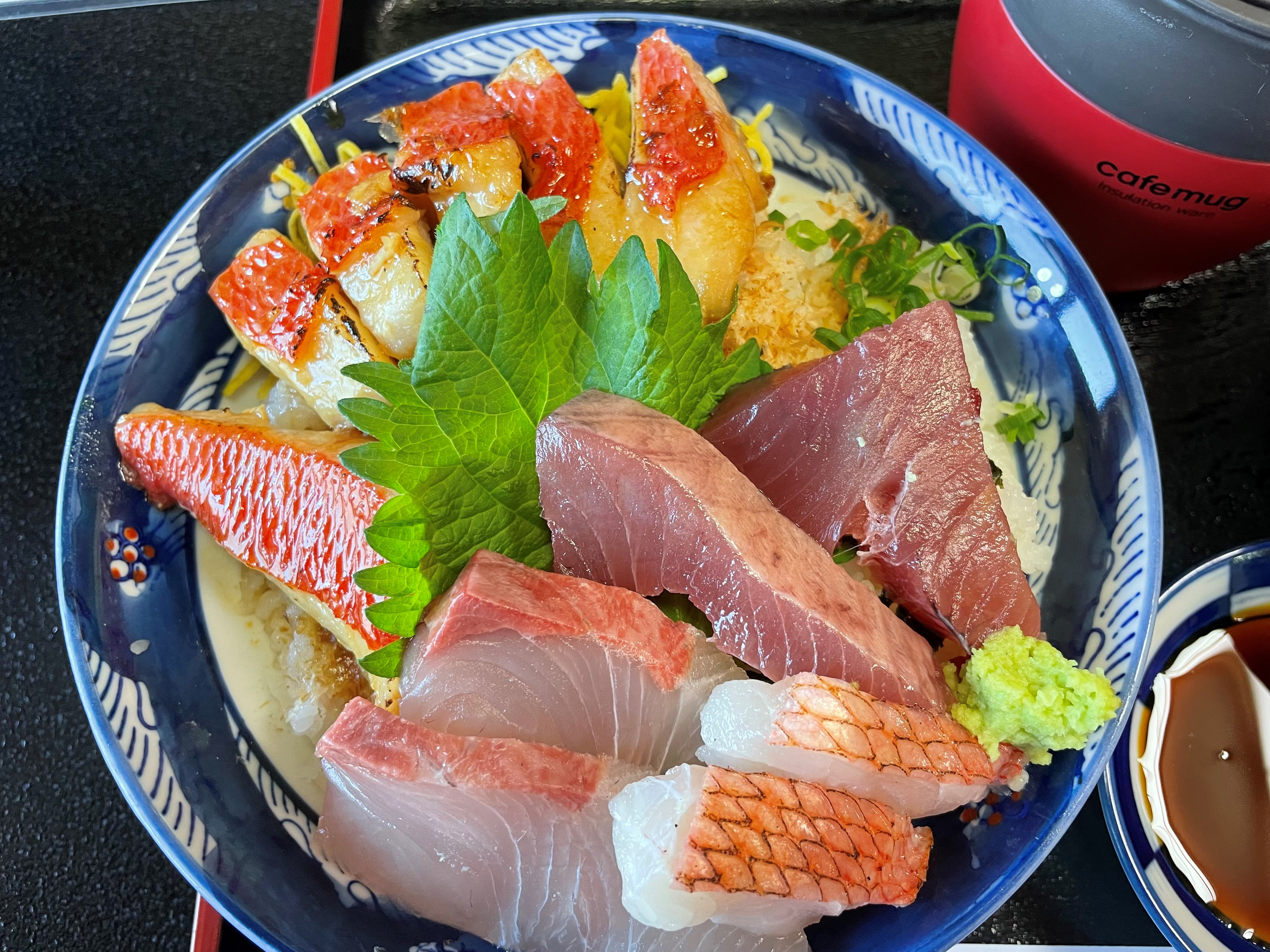
Donburi

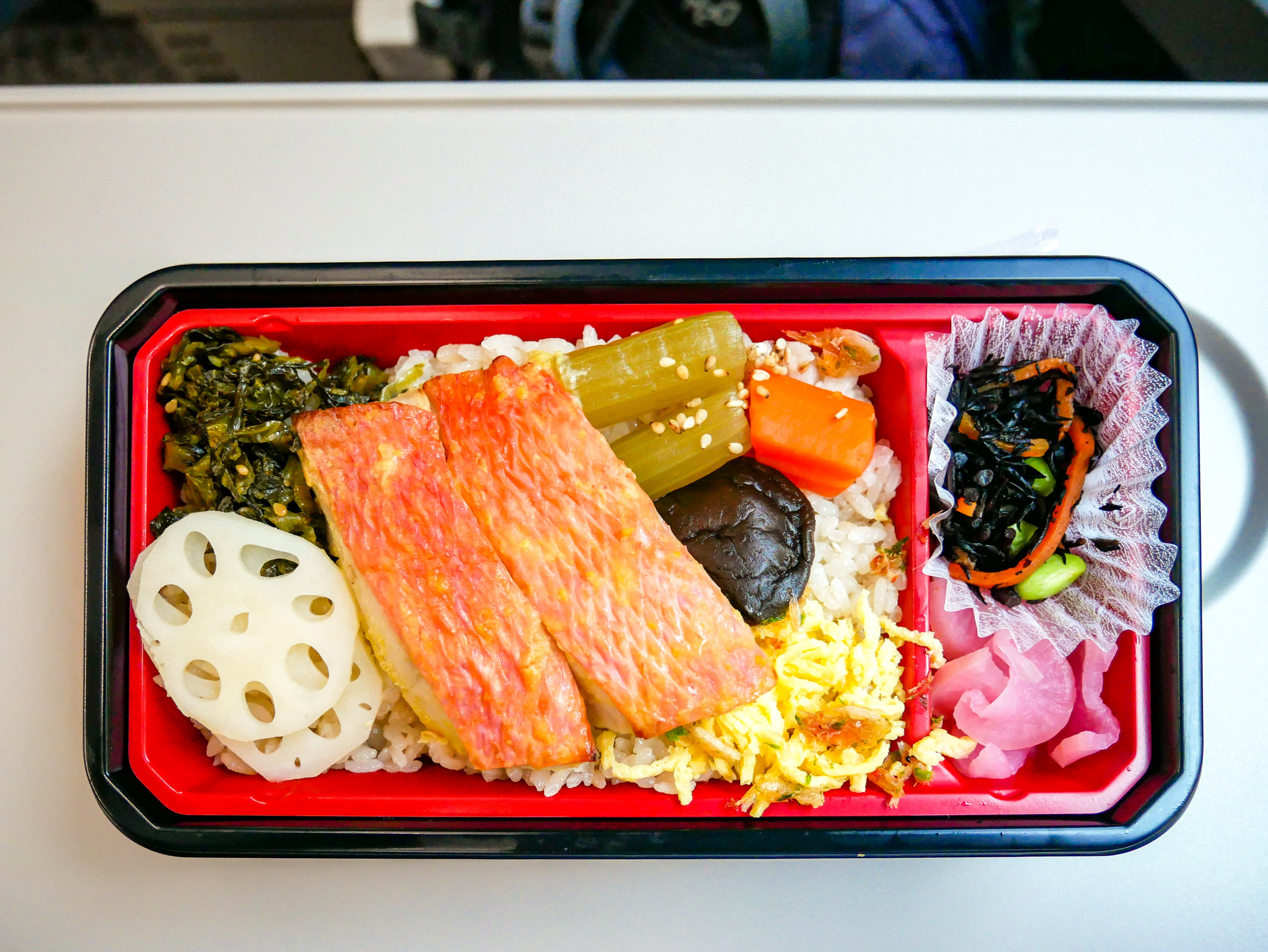
Bentō
