= Centroberyx rubricaudus =

Alfonsino

Scientific classification
- Kingdom: Animalia
- Phylum: Chordata
- Class: Actinopterygii
- Order: Beryciformes
- Family: Berycidae
- Genus: Centroberyx
- Species: C. rubricaudus

Binomial name
- Centroberyx rubricaudus Liu & Shen, 1985

Species of fish

Centroberyx rubricaudus is a member of the family Berycidae. Originally thought to be endemic to Taiwan, there has been a reported catch of C. rubricaudus at the Andaman Islands in the Indian Ocean.
