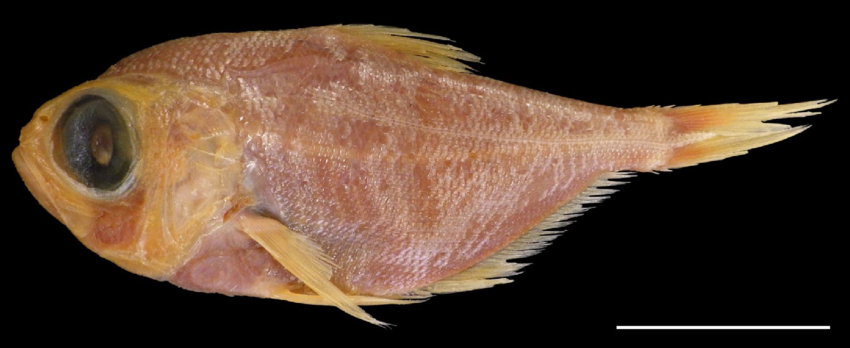
- Preserved specimen of Beryx mollis

Scientific classification
- Kingdom: Animalia
- Phylum: Chordata
- Class: Actinopterygii
- Order: Beryciformes
- Family: Berycidae
- Genus: Beryx
- Species: B. mollis

Binomial name
- Beryx mollis Abe, 1959

= Beryx mollis =

Species of fish

Beryx mollis is a member of the family Berycidae. It can be found in the Northwest Pacific near Japan and in the western Indian Ocean where it live at depths between 100 and 500 m (330 and 1,640 ft). It can reach sizes of up to 30.0 cm (11.8 in) SL.
