= Crimson snapper =

Crimson snapper is a common name for a number of fish:

- Pristipomoides filamentosus, more commonly known as the crimson jobfish
- Lutjanus erythropterus
