= Yelloweye nannygai =

Scientific classification
- Kingdom: Animalia
- Phylum: Chordata
- Class: Actinopterygii
- Order: Beryciformes
- Family: Berycidae
- Genus: Centroberyx
- Species: C. australis

Binomial name
- Centroberyx australis Shimizu & Hutchins, 1987

Synonyms
- Centroberyx affinis (non Günther, 1859)

Species of fish

The yelloweye nannygai or yelloweye redfish (Centroberyx australis) is a member of the family Berycidae. It is native to the coast of southern Australia where it lives on the continental shelf at depths between 80 and 300 m (260 and 980 ft). It can reach sizes of up to 51.0 cm (20.1 in) TL.
