= Argilloberyx =

Argilloberyx Temporal range: Lower Eocene

Scientific classification
- Kingdom: Animalia
- Phylum: Chordata
- Class: Actinopterygii
- Division: Teleostei
- Order: Beryciformes
- Family: Berycidae
- Genus: †Argilloberyx; Casier, 1966
- Species: †A. prestwichae

Binomial name
- †Argilloberyx prestwichae Casier, 1966

Extinct genus of fishes

Argilloberyx is an extinct genus of prehistoric marine bony fish that lived during the lower Eocene. It contains one species, A. prestwichae, known from the London Clay Formation on the Isle of Sheppey, United Kingdom. It is considered a member of the family Berycidae.

== See also ==
- Prehistoric fish
- List of prehistoric bony fish
