= C1orf198 =

Protein found in humans

Identifiers
- Aliases: C1orf198, chromosome 1 open reading frame 198
- External IDs: MGI: 1916801; GeneCards: C1orf198

Gene location (Human)
Chr.	Chromosome 1 (human)
Band	1q42.2	Start	230,837,119 bp
Band	1q42.2	End	230,869,589 bp

Gene location (Mouse)
Chr.	Chromosome 8 (mouse)
Band	8|8 E2	Start	125,362,495 bp
Band	8|8 E2	End	125,390,108 bp
RNA expression pattern
Bgee	Human / Mouse (ortholog); Top expressed in: cardiac muscle tissue of right atrium; tibialis anterior muscle; C1 segment; skin of arm; sural nerve; myocardium of left ventricle; right coronary artery; inferior ganglion of vagus nerve; tibial arteries; ascending aorta / Top expressed in: otolith organ; utricle; calvaria; suprachiasmatic nucleus; central gray substance of midbrain; nucleus of stria terminalis; Rostral migratory stream; superior colliculus; interventricular septum; paraventricular nucleus of hypothalamus; More reference expression data
BioGPS	n/a
Orthologs
Databases	NCBI: entry; OMA: entry
Species	Human	Mouse
Entrez	84886	69551
Ensembl	ENSG00000119280	ENSMUSG00000031983
UniProt	Q9H425	Q8C3W1
RefSeq (mRNA)	NM_032800; NM_001136494; NM_001136495	NM_175149
RefSeq (protein)	NP_001129966; NP_001129967; NP_116189; NP_116189.1	NP_780358
Location (UCSC)	Chr 1: 230.84 – 230.87 Mb	Chr 8: 125.36 – 125.39 Mb
PubMed search
- Wikidata
View/Edit Human	View/Edit Mouse

Chromosome 1 open reading frame 198 (C1orf198) is a protein that in humans is encoded by the C1orf198 gene. This particular gene does not have any paralogs in Homo sapiens, but many orthologs have been found throughout the Eukarya domain. C1orf198 has high levels of expression in all tissues throughout the human body, but is most highly expressed in lung, brain, and spinal cord tissues. Its function is most likely involved in lung development and hypoxia-associated events in the mitochondria, which are major consumers of oxygen in cells and are severely affected by decreases in available cellular oxygen.

== Gene ==
=== Location ===
C1orf198 is a protein-encoding gene found on the reverse strand of chromosome 1 at the locus 1q42. The longest mRNA transcript comprises 3,778 base pairs and spans from 230,837,119 to 230,869,589 on chromosome 1. The span of the gene from the start of transcription to polyA site, including introns, is 32,470 bp. This gene also contains a domain of unknown function called DUF4706. In total, C1orf198 has 4 exons.

The location of C1orf198 on chromosome 1.

=== Expression ===
==== Tissue distribution ====
RNA-seq tissue data revealed high expression of C1orf198 across all tissues, but especially high expression in lung, heart, spinal cord, and brain tissues. Expression from RNA-seq assays are reported as mean TPM, or transcripts per million, which correspond to mean values of the different individual samples from each tissue. Transcription profiling by high throughput sequencing revealed similar patterns of expression.

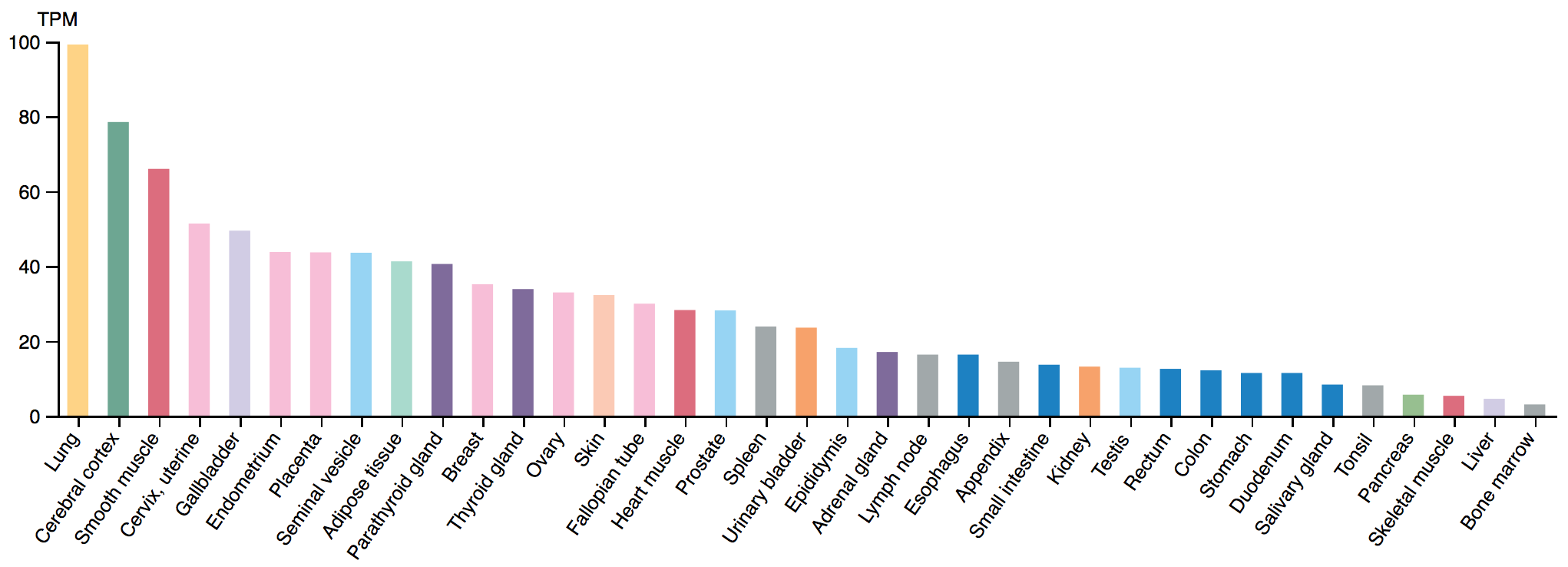
Gene expression of C1orf198 in human tissues

==== Conditional expression ====
Comparison of far-upstream element binding protein knockdowns revealed differential expression in C1orf198. Compared to FBP1 and FBP3, FBP2 knockdown had a significant impact on the expression of C1orf198. FBP2 knockdown was associated with a decrease in C1orf198 expression in comparison to cells with regular expression of FBP2.

=== Regulation ===
==== Promoter ====
A simple diagram of C1orf198, showing the exons, introns, and promoter

Genomatix predicted several promoters, but the best prediction was of a 1,223 bp long promoter that overlapped with exon 1 of C1orf198 by 82 bp. This promoter, GXP_127773, was conserved in all 15 orthologs found by Genomatix.

==== Transcription Factor Binding Sites ====
Many transcription factor (TF) binding sites have been predicted, but a few of the more notable TFs found to bind to a region on C1orf198 are XCPE1, HIF, and USF. XCPE1 is an important transcription factor for poorly categorized TATA-less genes in the human genome, and it drives RNA polymerase II transcription. It is found in the core promoter regions of approximately 1% of human genes. XCPE1 is located between nucleotides -8 and +2 in relation to the start of transcription (+1). With a matrix score of 0.83, it containing the correct consensus sequence, and its location on the promoter being correct, the probability of this transcription factor actually binding to this promoter is high.

HIF is a transcription factor that responds to decreases in available oxygen in the cellular environment. It functions as a master regulator of cellular and systemic homeostatic response to hypoxia by activating transcription of many genes. HIF-1 is known to induce transcription of gene involved in energy metabolism, angiogenesis, apoptosis, and other genes whose protein products increase oxygen delivery or facilitate metabolic adaptation to hypoxia.

LKLF2 is a transcription factor that has shown high expression in adult mouse lungs and is thought to play a role in lung development. Overexpression of LKLF in lung epithelial cells increases cytosolic phospholipase A2, which has shown to be the cause of tumorigenesis of non-small-cell lung cancer.

E26 transformation-specific (ETS) Proto-oncogene 1 functions as an oncogene and plays a key role in the progression of certain cancer. Expression of ETS1was increased in cancer tissues as compared with the expression in corresponding non-neoplastic tissues.

Finally, USF is an upstream stimulating factor, which is involved in mediating recruitment of chromatin remodelling enzymes and interacting with co-activators and members of the transcription pre-initiation complex.

== Protein ==
C1orf198’s longest isoform has a sequence length of 327 amino acids. The entire sequence is as follows:

MASMAAAIAASRSAVMSGNRPLDDRERKRFTYFSSLSPMARKIMQDKEKIREKYGPEWARLPPAQQDEII

DRCLVGPRAPAPRDPGDSEELTRFPGLRGPTGQKVVRFGDEDLTWQDEHSAPFSWETKSQMEFSISALSI

QEPSNGTAASEPRPLSKASQGSQALKSSQGSRSSSLDALGPTRKEEEASFWKINAERSRGEGPEAEFQSL

TPSQIKSMEKGEKVLPPCYRQEPAPKDREAKVERPSTLRQEQRPLPNVSTERERPQPVQAFSSALHEAAP

SQLEGKLPSPDVRQDDGEDTLFSEPKFAQVSSSNVVLKTGFDFLDNW

The entire protein has a theoretical molecular weight of 36.346 kDa and its isoelectric point is 5.6.

=== Isoforms ===
Three different isoforms of C1orf198 have been found. The longest isoform contains 327 amino acids and has a molecular mass of 36.3 kDa. The second isoform is 289 amino acids long. The third and last known isoform is 197 amino acids long and also lacks DUF4706.

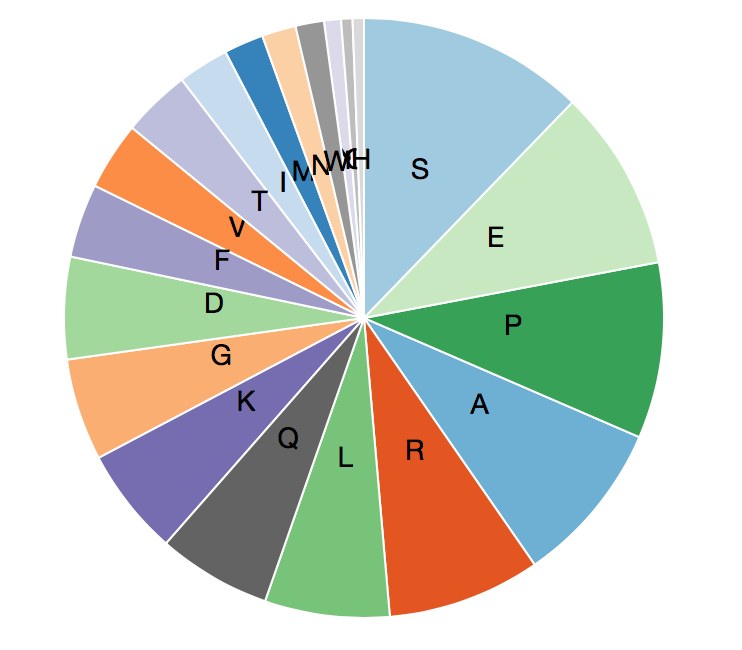
The amino acid composition of C1orf198

=== Amino acid composition ===
C1orf198 has the highest composition of serine, glutamic acid, proline, alanine, and arginine; It has the lowest composition of histidine. Relative to the average human protein, C1orf198 is serine-rich, proline-rich, and tyrosine-poor.

=== Domain ===
This sequence includes a domain of unknown function, DUF4706, which is approximately 101 amino acids long. DUF4706 is located from amino acids 31 to 131 on C1orf198. It has a predicted molecular weight of 11.6 kDa and an isoelectric point of 5.41.

=== Post-translational modifications ===
The post-translational modifications (PTMs) found in C1orf198 include phosphorylations, SUMOylations, and O-linked β-N-acetylglucosamine (O-GlcNAc) sites. While phosphorylations are the most common PTM and found in all protein types, O-GlcNAc is a regulatory PTM of nuclear and cytosolic proteins.

=== Subcellular location ===
C1orf198 is predicted to be targeted towards the cytoplasm, mitochondria, and nucleus. The most highly supported sub cellular location is the cytoplasm, with many bioinformatics tools citing that as the sole location. Both immunohistochemistry and immunofluorescent staining of human cells showed strong cytoplasmic positivity. However, a mitochondrial targeting peptide was predicted in C1orf198, suggesting that its directed towards the mitochondria in some situations.

=== Interactions ===
Multiple protein interactions with C1orf198 were found using text mining. One protein interaction involved SART1, which is also known as hypoxia-associated factor. SART1 is known to play a role in mRNA splicing and appears to play a role in hypoxia-induced regulation of EPO gene expression Another protein that interacts with C1orf198 is TOMM20, which is a mitochondrial import receptor subunit. TOMM20 is responsible for the recognition and translocation of cytosolically synthesized mitochondrial preproteins.

== Evolution ==
=== Paralogs ===
There are no known paralogs of C1orf198.

=== Homologs ===
As seen in the table below, the homologs for C1orf198 trace back to insects, which diverged from human approximately 797 million years ago.

Species	Estimated Date of Divergence from Humans (in MYA).	Identity	Similarity	Amino Acid Sequence Length	Reference Sequence
Homo sapiens (Human)	0	100%	100%	327	NP_116189
Delphinapterus leucas(Beluga Whale)	96	81%	86%	317	XP_022408830.1
Hipposideros armiger (Great Roundleaf Bat)	96	79%	85%	317	XP_019521397.1
Erinaceus europaeus (European Hedgehog)	96	76%	82%	333	XP_007538428.1
Phascolarctos cinereus (Koala)	159	65%	76%	333	XP_020856095.1
Parus major (Great Tit)	312	59%	72%	335	XP_015478640.1
Numida meleagris (Helmeted Guineafowl)	312	59%	71%	335	XP_021245723.1
Gallus gallus (Chicken)	312	59%	70%	334	XP_015139870.1
Pogona vitticeps (Bearded Dragon)	312	58%	69%	333	XP_020656857.1
Notechis scutatus (Tiger Snake)	312	57%	69%	333	XP_026525262.1
Gekko japonicus (Japanese Gecko)	312	57%	69%	330	XP_015284731.1
Xenopus tropicalis (Tropical Clawed Frog)	352	47%	68%	350	XP_002942404.1
Monopterus albus (Asian Swamp Eel)	435	42%	56%	360	XP_020471043.1
Anabas testudineus (Climbing Perch)	435	42%	56%	352	XP_026197678.1
Danio rerio (Zebrafish)	435	41%	54%	330	NP_001188382.1
Callorhinchus milii (Elephant Shark)	473	48%	60%	349	XP_007896578.1
Helicoverpa armigera (Cotton Bollworm)	797	28%	40%	284	XP_021198534.1
Copidosoma floridanum (Wasp)	797	25%	41%	297	XP_014207188.1
Chilo suppressalis (Asiatic Rice Borer)	797	24%	40%	280	RVE51599.1

=== Homologous domains ===
The domain of unknown function 4706 (DUF4706) was highly conserved in most orthologs.

== Function and biochemistry ==
C1orf198 is most likely involved in lung development and hypoxia-associated events in the mitochondria, which are major consumers of oxygen in cells and are severely affected by decreases in available cellular oxygen. This is supported by a few major findings. First, the transcription factor LKLF binds to the promoter, which is involved in embryonic lung development and can cause lung cancer if overexpressed. The protein product also interacts with SART1, also known as hypoxia associated factor, which appears to play a role in hypoxia-induced regulation of EPO gene expression.

== Clinical significance ==
C1orf198 has been found to be associated with a few diseases and disorders, even though the function of the gene is not yet well understood. For example, it was identified as a novel gene in colon, gastric, and pancreatic cancer. Specifically, it was found to be a positive impact factor of gastric cancer. Additionally, microarray analysis revealed that C1orf198 was a differentially expressed gene (DEG) between lung squamous cell carcinoma (SCC) and normal controls. The down-regulation of C1orf198 was found to be correlated to lung SCC but was not one of the top DEGs found in the study. A third association was found to be an upregulation of C1orf198 in ginsenoside RH2-treated MCF-7, which is a human breast cancer cell line. When the cell line was treated with RH2, the C1orf198 gene was found to be hypomethylated, which suggested that its function could be involved in cell-mediated immune responses and cancer-related pathways. The results of this study showed a higher survival rate associated with the up-regulation of C1orf198.
