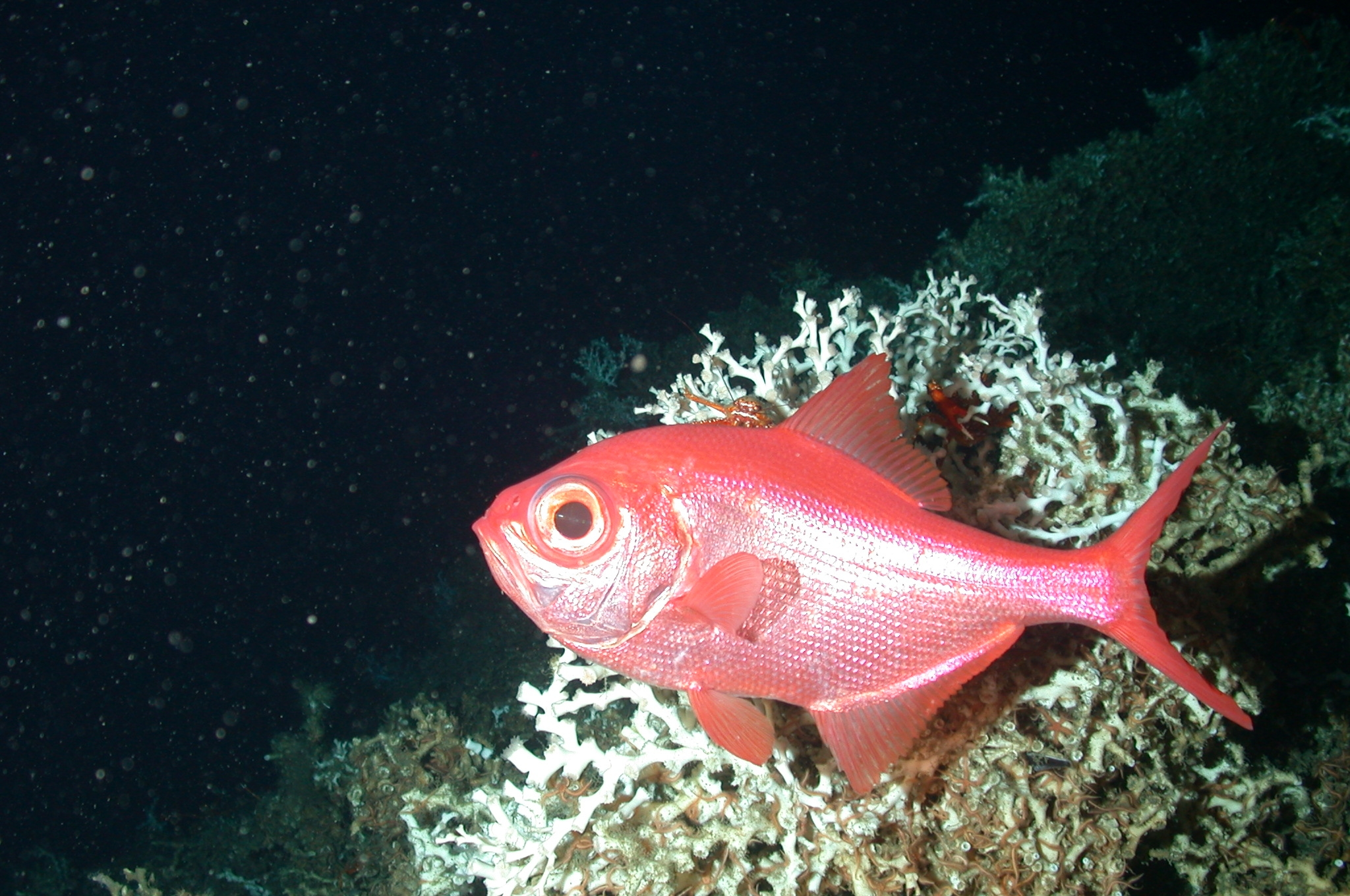
- Alfonsino (B. decadactylus)

Scientific classification
- Domain: Eukaryota
- Kingdom: Animalia
- Phylum: Chordata
- Class: Actinopterygii
- Order: Beryciformes
- Family: Berycidae
- Genus: Beryx; G. Cuvier, 1829

Species
- see text

= Beryx =

Genus of fishes

Beryx is a genus of alfonsinos found in deep oceanic waters. Two of its member species, B. decadactylus and B. splendens, are found across nearly the entire globe and are of some commercial importance.

== Species ==
There are currently three recognized species in this genus:

- Beryx decadactylus G. Cuvier, 1829 (Alfonsino)
- Beryx mollis T. Abe, 1959
- Beryx splendens R. T. Lowe, 1834 (Splendid alfonsino)
