= SART1 =

Protein-coding gene in the species Homo sapiens

Identifiers
- Aliases: SART1, Ara1, HOMS1, SART1259, SNRNP110, Snu66, squamous cell carcinoma antigen recognized by T-cells 1, HAF, U4/U6.U5 tri-snRNP-associated protein 1, spliceosome associated factor 1, recruiter of U4/U6.U5 tri-snRNP
- External IDs: OMIM: 605941; MGI: 1309453; GeneCards: SART1
Available structures
PDB	Ortholog search: PDBe RCSB
PDB	List of PDB id codes 4PYU

Gene location (Human)
Chr.	Chromosome 11 (human)
Band	11q13.1	Start	65,961,728 bp
Band	11q13.1	End	65,980,137 bp

Gene location (Mouse)
Chr.	Chromosome 19 (mouse)
Band	19|19 A	Start	5,427,551 bp
Band	19|19 A	End	5,438,731 bp
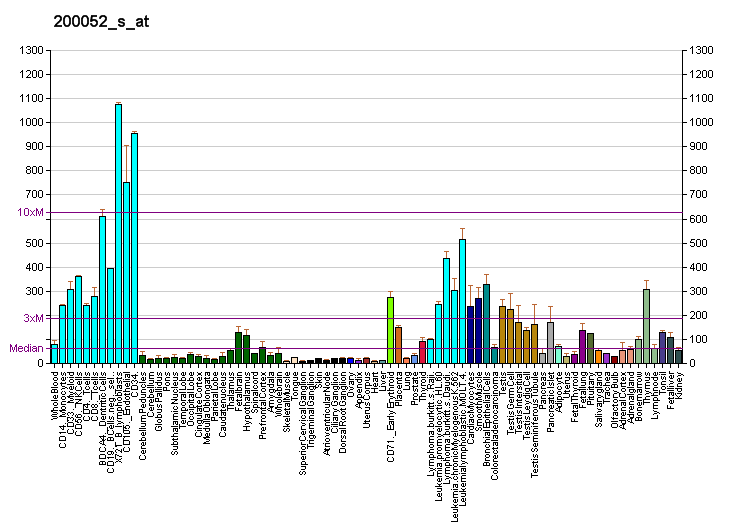
RNA expression pattern
Bgee	Human / Mouse (ortholog); Top expressed in: tendon of biceps brachii; apex of heart; granulocyte; olfactory zone of nasal mucosa; ectocervix; mucosa of transverse colon; anterior pituitary; canal of the cervix; right lobe of thyroid gland; skin of leg / Top expressed in: neural layer of retina; ventricular zone; yolk sac; granulocyte; saccule; otic placode; thymus; otic vesicle; lip; epiblast; More reference expression data
BioGPS	More reference expression data
Gene ontology
Molecular function	protein binding; RNA binding
Cellular component	cytoplasm; cytosol; Cajal body; Golgi apparatus; U4/U6 x U5 tri-snRNP complex; catalytic step 2 spliceosome; spliceosomal complex; nucleus; nucleoplasm; nuclear speck; U2-type precatalytic spliceosome
Biological process	mRNA cis splicing, via spliceosome; positive regulation of cytotoxic T cell differentiation; intrinsic apoptotic signaling pathway; mRNA splicing, via spliceosome; mRNA processing; maturation of 5S rRNA; spliceosomal snRNP assembly; RNA splicing
Sources:Amigo / QuickGO
Orthologs
Databases	NCBI: entry; OMA: entry
Species	Human	Mouse
Entrez	9092	20227
Ensembl	ENSG00000175467	ENSMUSG00000039148
UniProt	O43290	Q9Z315
RefSeq (mRNA)	NM_005146	NM_016882
RefSeq (protein)	NP_005137	NP_058578
Location (UCSC)	Chr 11: 65.96 – 65.98 Mb	Chr 19: 5.43 – 5.44 Mb
PubMed search
- Wikidata
View/Edit Human	View/Edit Mouse

U4/U6.U5 tri-snRNP-associated protein 1 is a protein that in humans is encoded by the SART1 gene. This gene encodes two proteins, the SART1(800) protein expressed in the nucleus of the majority of proliferating cells, and the SART1(259) protein expressed in the cytosol of epithelial cancers. The SART1(259) protein is translated by the mechanism of -1 frameshifting during posttranscriptional regulation. The two encoded proteins are thought to be involved in the regulation of proliferation. Both proteins have tumor-rejection antigens. The SART1(259) protein possesses tumor epitopes capable of inducing HLA-A2402-restricted cytotoxic T lymphocytes in cancer patients. This SART1(259) antigen may be useful in specific immunotherapy for cancer patients and may serve as a paradigmatic tool for the diagnosis and treatment of patients with atopy. The SART1(259) protein is found to be essential for the recruitment of the tri-snRNP to the pre-spliceosome in the spliceosome assembly pathway.
