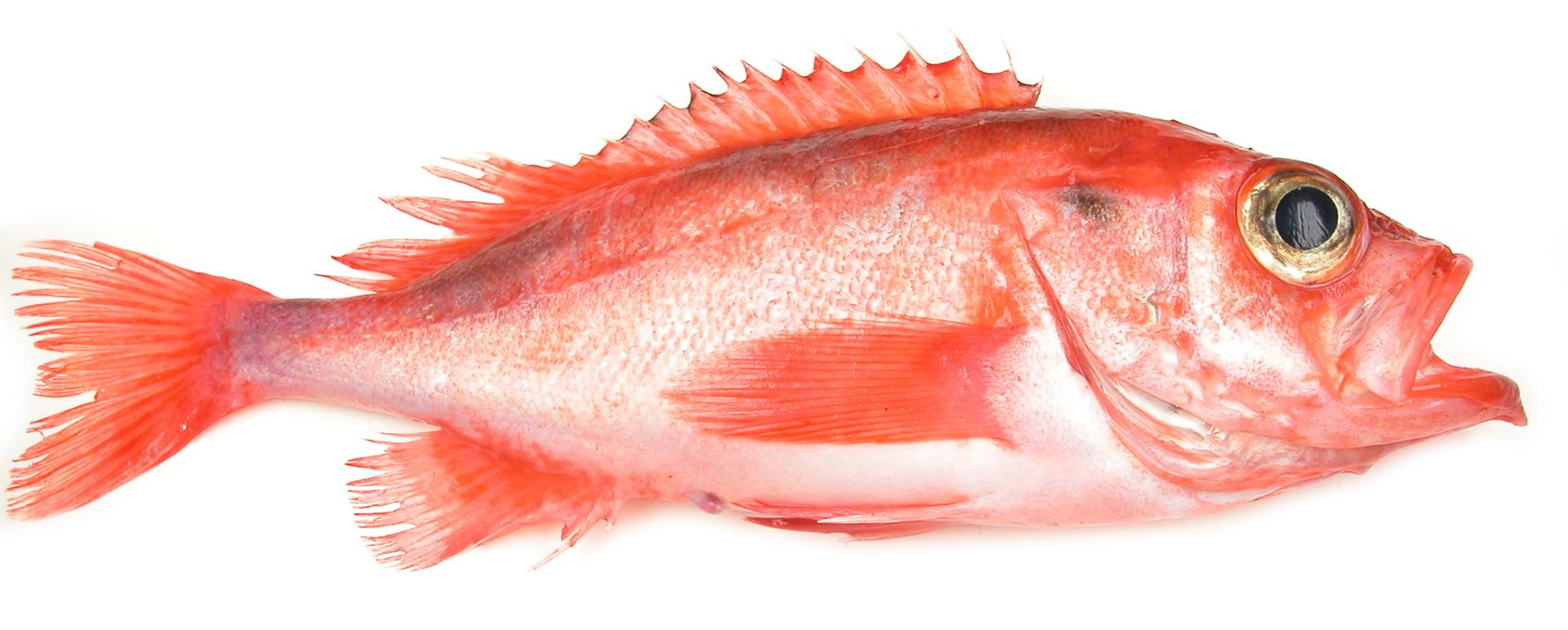

Conservation status
- Least Concern (IUCN 3.1)

Scientific classification
- Kingdom: Animalia
- Phylum: Chordata
- Class: Actinopterygii
- Order: Perciformes
- Family: Scorpaenidae
- Genus: Sebastes
- Species: S. mentella

Binomial name
- Sebastes mentella Travin, 1951

Synonyms
- Sebastichthys mentella (Travin, 1951)

= Sebastes mentella =

Species of fish

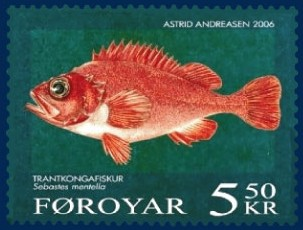
Deepwater redfish on a stamp of Postverk Føroya (Faroe Islands), 2006.

Sebastes mentella, the beaked redfish, deepwater redfin, ocean perch, Atlantic redfish, Norway haddock, red perch, golden redfish, or hemdurgan, is a species of marine ray-finned fish belonging to the subfamily Sebastinae, the rockfishes, part of the family Scorpaenidae. This species is found in the North Atlantic Ocean.

== Taxonomy ==
Sebastes mentella was first formally described in 1951 by the Soviet biologist Valentin Ivanovich Travin with the type locality given as the Bear Island Banks in the Barents Sea. The beaked redfish has been known to hybridise with the Acadian redfish (S. fasciatus). This species is classified within the subgenus Sebastes by some authorities. The specific name mentella is a diminutive of mentum which means "chin", a reference to the obvious symphyseal knob.

== Description ==
Sebastes mentella has an elongated and compressed body with a deep head and a wide mouth, There are two spines on the preorbital bone with 1 or 2 spiny points above the maxilla; the suborbital ridge has no spines and is typically not well marked and there are spines on the nasal, pre-ocular, supraocular and postocular and parietal bones. On the symphysis of the lower jaw there is a well developed and sharply projecting knob. The gill cover has no supplemental preopercular spine absent but all 5 preopercular spines are roughly equal in length, there is a supracleithral spine and 2 spines on the operculum of which the lower spine is directed downwards and forwards. The dorsal fin has 14–16 spines and 13–17, typically 14 or 15 soft rays while the anal fin has 3 spines and 7–11, usually 9 soft rays. This species has reached a maximum total length of 77.5 cm (30.5 in).

== Distribution and habitat ==
Sebastes mentella is found in the northern Atlantic Ocean. It occurs from Baffin Island south to Nova Scotia, around Greenland and Iceland, along the Iceland-Faroes ridge and northwards off Norway as far as Svalbard, Jan Mayen and the Barents Sea. This is a bathypelagic, oceanic species which is found at depth between 300 and 1,441 m (984 and 4,728 ft).

== Biology ==
Sebastes mentella is ovoviviparous, the females are inseminated by the males in August–September in the Barents Sea or from September to mid-December off Iceland. The eggs are fertilised in January and February in the Barents Sea or in March off Iceland. The larvae are released from the females during April to June. This is a gregarious species at all stages of its life cycle, It feeds on krill, hyperiids, cephalopods, chaetognaths and small fishes. This is a long lived species which may live as long as 75 years in the Nova Scotia stock, although elsewhere a maximum age of 65 years is typical.

== Fisheries ==
Sebastes mentella is caught using trawls. There is a major commercial fishery targeting this species but this is closely monitored. In 2006 the total catch landed was 61,500 t (60,500 long tons; 67,800 short tons).

== Sustainable consumption ==
In 2010, Greenpeace International added the deepwater redfish to its seafood red list: "The Greenpeace International seafood red list is a list of fish that are commonly sold around the world, and which have a very high risk of being sourced from unsustainable fisheries."
