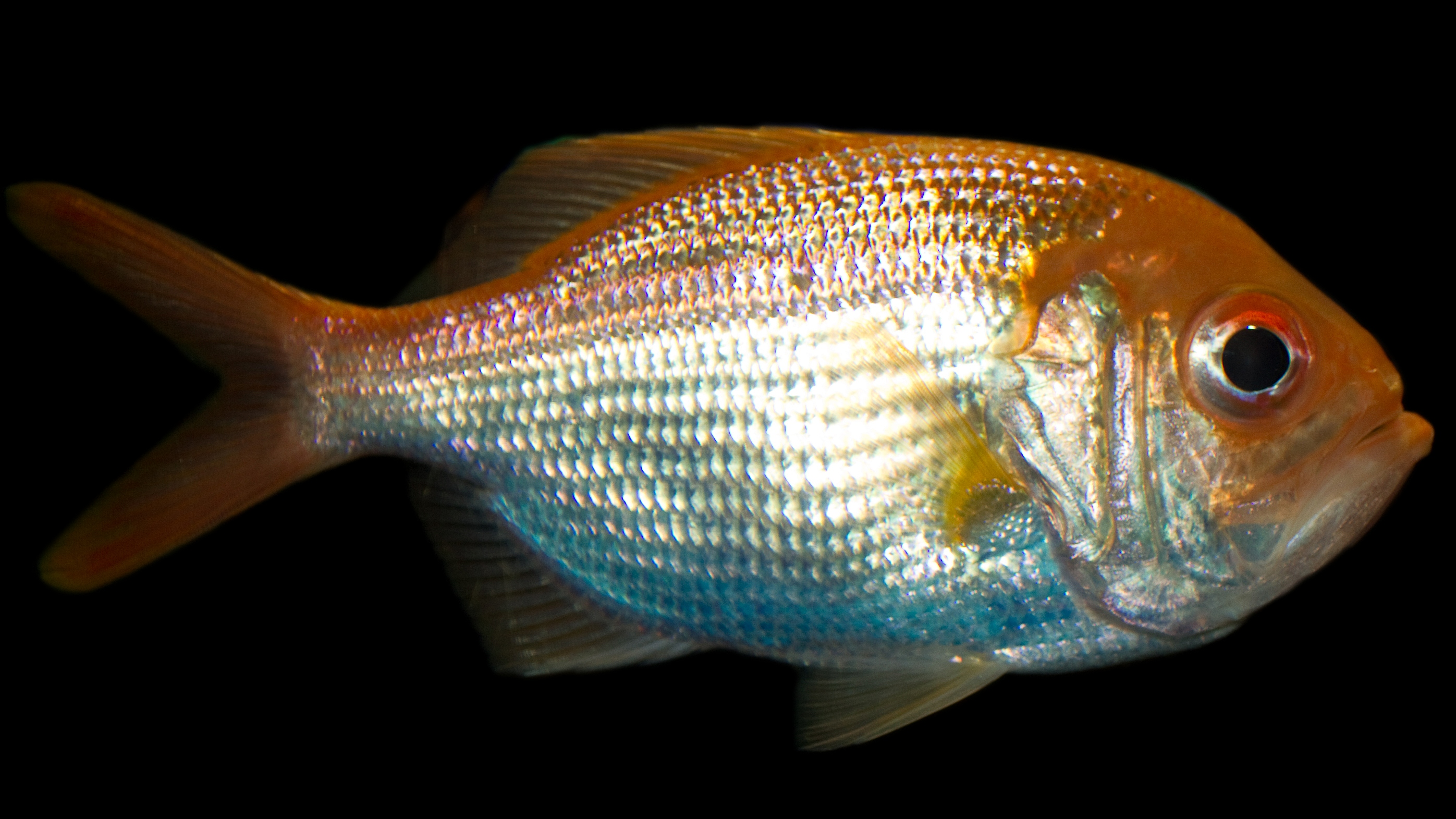
- Redfish (Centroberyx affinis)

Scientific classification
- Domain: Eukaryota
- Kingdom: Animalia
- Phylum: Chordata
- Class: Actinopterygii
- Order: Beryciformes
- Family: Berycidae
- Genus: Centroberyx; T. N. Gill, 1862

Species
- see text

= Centroberyx =

Genus of fishes

Centroberyx, often referred to as nannygais, is a genus of ray-finned fishes found. It is found in the Indian Ocean and western Pacific Ocean, with its greatest species richness off southern Australia. They are reddish in colour and somewhat resemble the related soldierfish. Depending on species, they may have a maximum length of 20 to 66 centimetres (7.9 to 26.0 in). They are found at depths of 10 to 500 metres (33 to 1,640 ft). Members of this genus are also known from fossils from the Cretaceous.

== Species ==
There are currently seven recognized extant species in this genus:

- Centroberyx affinis (Günther, 1859) (Redfish)
- Centroberyx australis Shimizu & Hutchins, 1987 (Yelloweye nannygai)
- Centroberyx druzhinini (Busakhin, 1981)
- Centroberyx gerrardi (Günther, 1887) (Bight redfish)
- Centroberyx lineatus (G. Cuvier, 1829) (Swallow-tail)
- Centroberyx rubricaudus Chen-Hsiang Liu & S. C. Shen, 1985
- Centroberyx spinosus (Gilchrist, 1903) (Short alfonsino)
