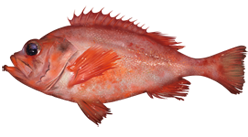

Conservation status
- Endangered (IUCN 3.1)

Scientific classification
- Kingdom: Animalia
- Phylum: Chordata
- Class: Actinopterygii
- Division: Teleostei
- Order: Perciformes
- Family: Scorpaenidae
- Genus: Sebastes
- Species: S. fasciatus

Binomial name
- Sebastes fasciatus D. H. Storer, 1854

= Acadian redfish =

Species of fish

The Acadian redfish (Sebastes fasciatus), also known as the Atlantic redfish, Acadian rockfish, or Labrador redfish, is a species of marine ray-finned fish belonging to the subfamily Sebastinae, the rockfishes, part of the family Scorpaenidae. It is native to the deep waters of the northwestern Atlantic.

== Taxonomy ==
The Acadian redfish was first formally described in 1854 by the American physician and zoologist David Humphreys Storer with the type locality given as the harbor at Provincetown, Massachusetts. The Acadian redfish has been known to hybridise with the beaked redfish (S. mentella). This species is classified within the subgenus Sebastes by some authorities. The specific name fasciatus means "banded", an allusion to the four clear bands on the flanks.

== Description ==
The Acadian redfish is colored reddish-orange and can live up to 50 years or more and reach lengths up to 20 in (508 mm). It is very similar in appearance to the deepwater redfish (S. mentella). The two species can be distinguished by the number of soft rays in the anal fin, internal examination of the gas bladder, or by genetic testing.

== Distribution and habitat ==
The Acadian redfish is native to the waters of the northwestern Atlantic Ocean and its range extends from Virginia, the Gulf of St. Lawrence, Nova Scotia, western Greenland and Iceland. It is found at depths varying between 70 and 500 m (230 and 1,640 ft). It swims near the seabed in areas with clay-silt or rocky bottoms.

== Biology ==
The Acadian redfish feeds on a variety of crustaceans, mollusks, and smaller fish. It spawns in the fall to late winter. The species is ovoviviparous, and females release 15,000–20,000 fully formed larvae into the water per season. The Acadian redfish is preyed on by the halibut, the Atlantic cod, swordfishes and harbor seals.

== Conservation ==
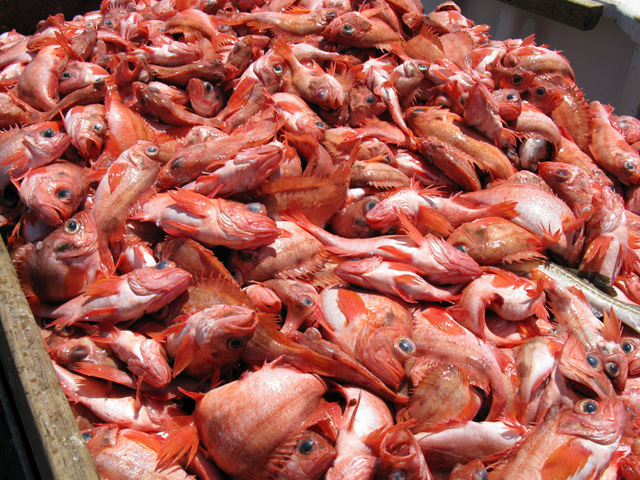
Catch of Acadian redfish

Due to its slow growth rate, low fecundity, harmless nature, tendency to "hit almost any bait", and being considered a great food fish, the Acadian redfish was classified as Endangered by the IUCN in 1996. However, due to conservation efforts, the redfish population has rebounded, and in 2012 the species was described as fully rebuilt, sustainably managed and responsibly harvested under U.S. regulations.
