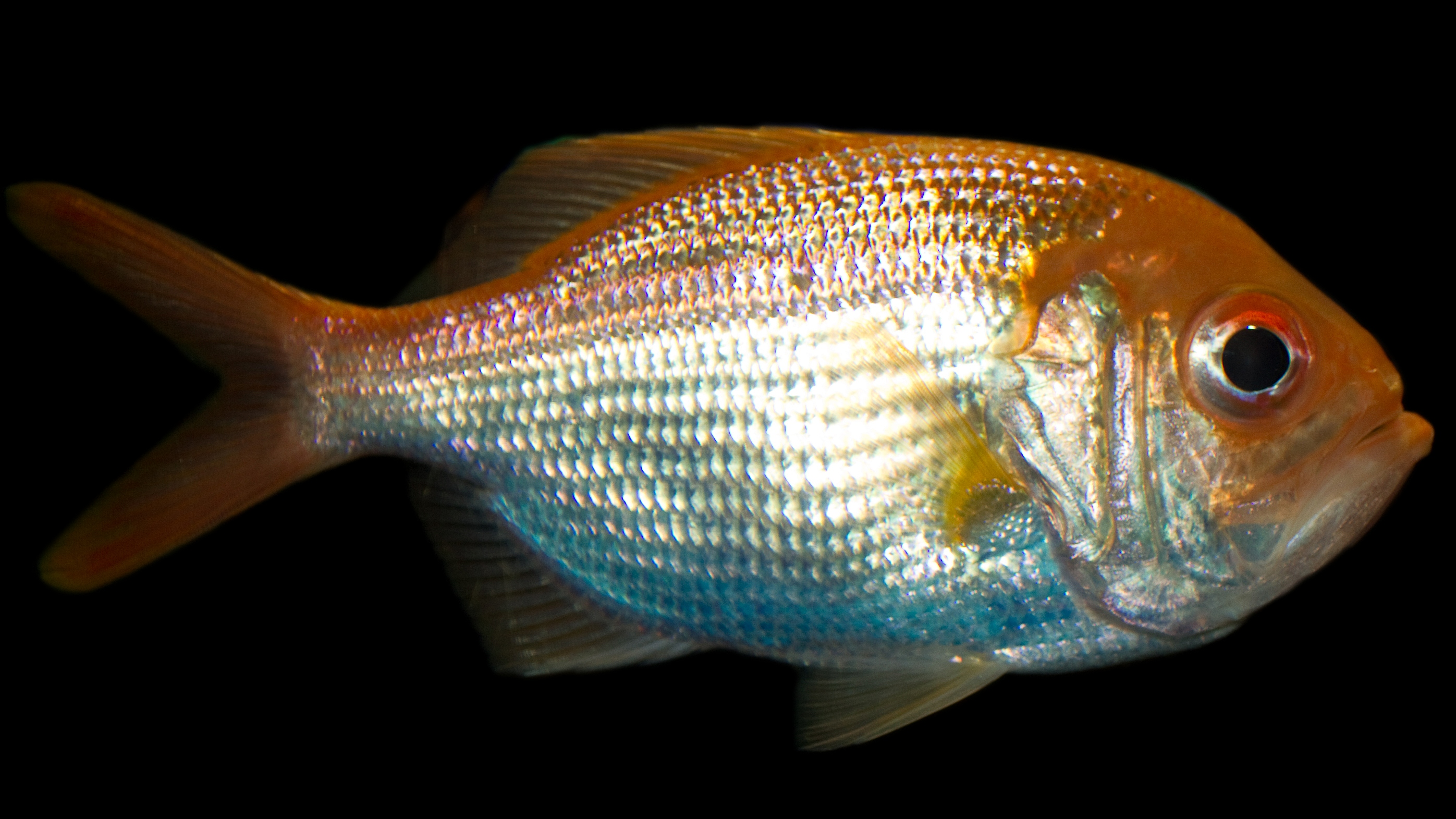

Scientific classification
- Domain: Eukaryota
- Kingdom: Animalia
- Phylum: Chordata
- Class: Actinopterygii
- Order: Beryciformes
- Family: Berycidae
- Genus: Centroberyx
- Species: C. affinis

Binomial name
- Centroberyx affinis (Günther, 1859)

= Eastern nannygai =

Species of fish

The eastern nannygai (Centroberyx affinis), also known as the redfish, bight redfish, red snapper, golden snapper or koarea, is an alfonsino of the genus Centroberyx. It is found around Australia and New Zealand at depths between 10 and 450 metres (33 and 1,476 ft) on the continental shelf. It can reach lengths of up to 51.0 centimetres (20.1 in) SL. It forms schools near the sea floor over rocky reefs and mud at dawn and dusk, splitting up at night to feed on mollusks, crustaceans, and small fish. Its young live in estuaries and shallow coastal waters.

Exploited commercially in New South Wales and South Australia, nannygai are considered to be excellent table fish.
