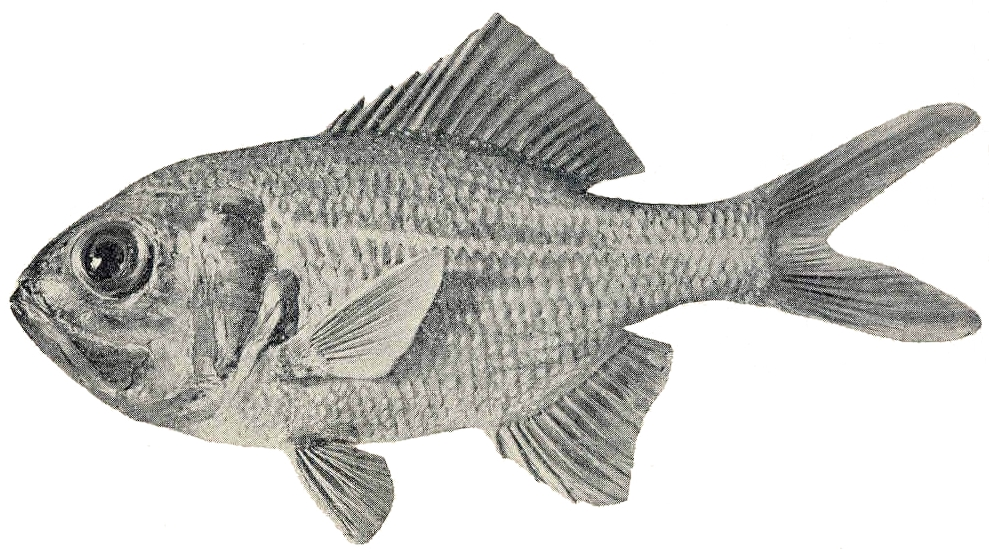

Scientific classification
- Domain: Eukaryota
- Kingdom: Animalia
- Phylum: Chordata
- Class: Actinopterygii
- Order: Beryciformes
- Family: Berycidae
- Genus: Centroberyx
- Species: C. gerrardi

Binomial name
- Centroberyx gerrardi (Günther, 1887)

Synonyms
- Beryx gerrardi Günther, 1887; Austroberyx gerrardi (Günther, 1887); Trachichthodes gerrardi (Günther, 1887)

= Bight redfish =

Species of fish

The bight redfish (Centroberyx gerrardi) is a member of the order Beryciformes. It is native to the waters off of Australia's southern coast from off Lancelin, Western Australia to Bass Strait where it lives at depths from 10 to 500 m (33 to 1,640 ft). It can reach sizes of up to 66.0 cm (26.0 in) TL.
