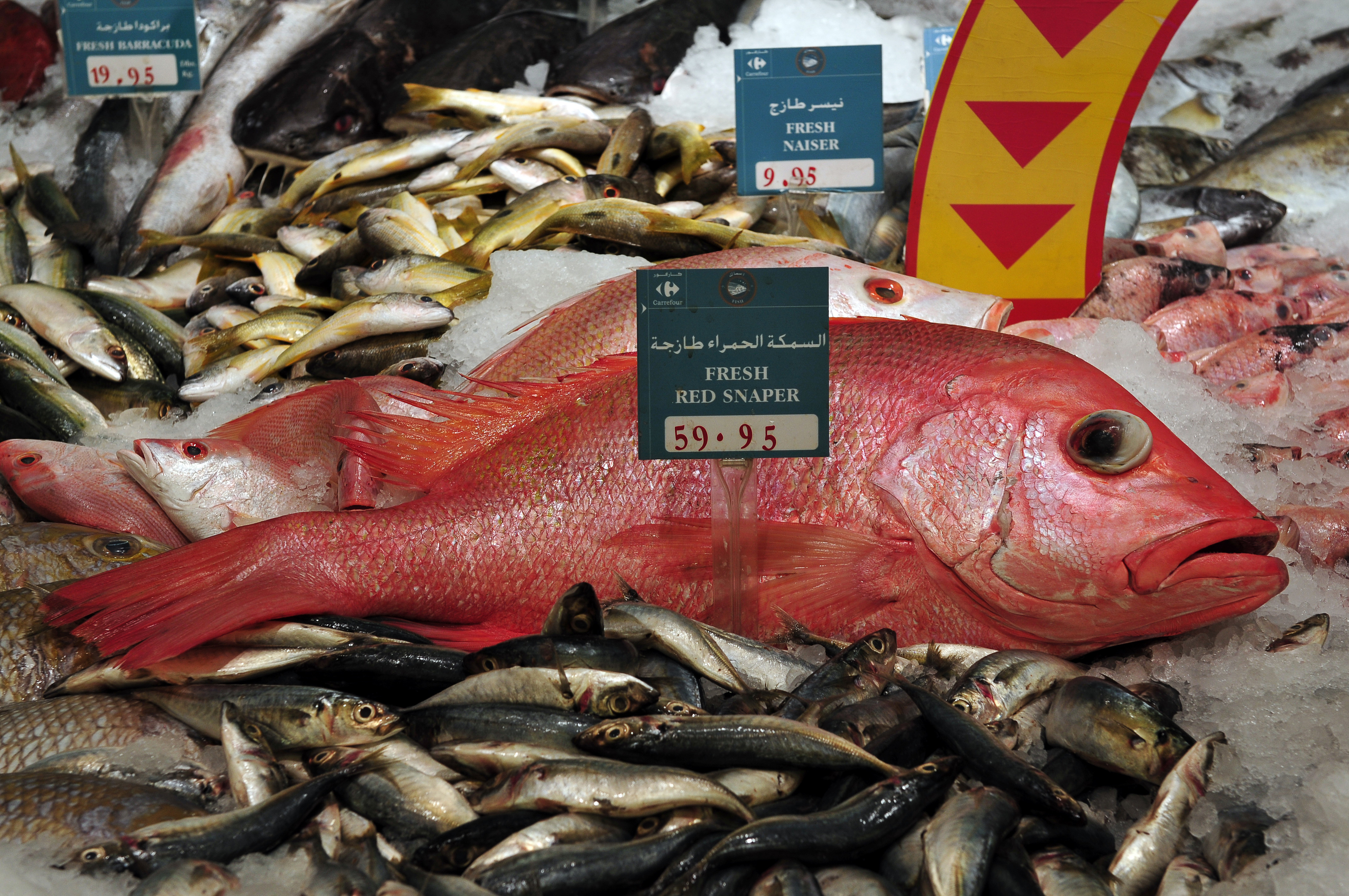

Conservation status
- Least Concern (IUCN 3.1)(Global)

- Near Threatened (IUCN 3.1) (Persian Gulf)

Scientific classification
- Kingdom: Animalia
- Phylum: Chordata
- Class: Actinopterygii
- Order: Acanthuriformes
- Family: Lutjanidae
- Genus: Lutjanus
- Species: L. malabaricus

Binomial name
- Lutjanus malabaricus (Bloch & Schneider, 1801)

Synonyms
- Sparus malabaricus Bloch & Schneider, 1801; Mesoprion dodecacanthus Bleeker, 1853; Lutjanus dodecacanthus (Bleeker, 1853)

= Lutjanus malabaricus =

Species of fish

Lutjanus malabaricus, the Malabar blood snapper, saddletail snapper, large-mouthed nannygai, large-mouthed sea-perch, Malabar snapper, nannygai, red bass, red bream, red emperor, red Jew, red snapper, saddletail seaperch, scarlet emperor or scarlet sea-perch, is a species of marine ray-finned fish, a snapper belonging to the family Lutjanidae. It is native to the Indian Ocean and the western Pacific, where it is found east to Fiji and Japan.

== Taxonomy ==
Lutjanus malabaricus was first formally described in 1801 as Sparus malabaricus by the German naturalists Marcus Elieser Bloch and Johann Gottlob Schneider with the type locality as the Coromandel coast in eastern India. The specific name malabaricus means "of Malabar", a coastal region of southern India.

== Description ==
Lutjanus malabaricus has a relatively deep body, which has a standard length that is 2.2 to 2.8 times as long as the body at its deepest point. It has a steeply sloped forehead, with a concave upper profile to the snout, and the preopercular incision and knob are weakly developed. The vomerine teeth are arranged in a crescent shaped or triangular patch with no central rearwards extension, and there are no teeth on the tongue. The dorsal fin has 11 spines and 12-14 soft rays, while the anal fin contains 3 spines and 8-9 soft rays. The rear of the dorsal fin and the anal fin may have an angular profile or be weakly rounded, the pectoral fins have 16–17 rays and the caudal fin is truncate. This fish attains a maximum total length of 100 cm (39 in), although 50 cm (20 in) is more typical, with a maximum published weight of 7.9 kg (17 lb). The back and flanks are red or reddish-orange, paler on the lower shanks and abdomen, and the fins are reddish. The juveniles have a wide, diagonal band of brown or black which starts on the upper jaw and ends at the front of the dorsal fin, they also have an obvious black band across the caudal peduncle which has a pearly-white margin on its front edge.; They may also show a series of thin reddish longitudinal stripes on the flanks.

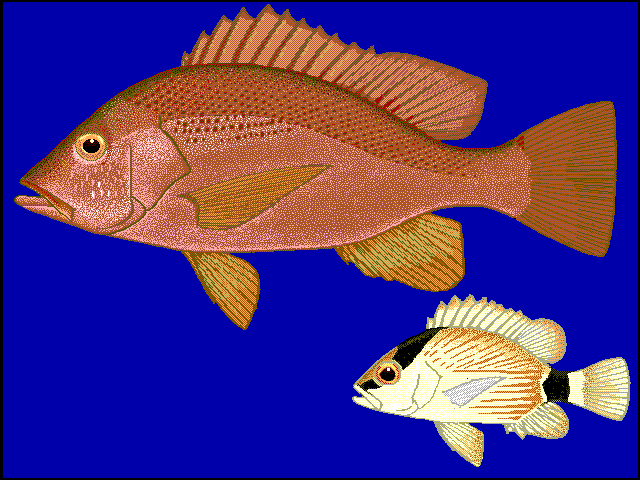

It can be distinguished from the scarlet snapper (Lutjanus erythropterus) by its larger head and mouth.

== Distribution and habitat ==
Lutjanus malabaricus has a wide range in the Indo-West Pacific to the Persian Gulf east to Fiji, from southern Japan south to Australia. It has also been confirmed to occur in Tonga and Kosrae and at Jeju Island in South Korea. There are also unconfirmed reports from Eastern Africa. In Australia, its range extends from Shark Bay in Western Australia along the western, northern and eastern coasts, extending as far south as Sydney. Adults occur in coastal and offshore reefs, frequently being encountered around sponges and gorgonian corals, or in areas of hard muddy bottom. The juveniles show a preference for shallow waters close to shore, while the adults prefer deeper areas.

== Biology ==
Lutjanus malabaricus forms mixed aggregations with other snappers, in Australia this tends to be with the crimson snapper. They are nocturnal hunters foraging during the night, predominantly for fish, but they also catch a few benthic crustaceans, cephalopods and other benthic invertebrates. They spawn for much of the year closer to the equator, peaking in spring and summer off New Caledonia and Australia.

== Fisheries and conservation ==
Lutjanus malabaricus is considered to be a high quality food fish and is pursued by commercial, artisanal and recreational fisheries throughout its range. It is considered to be overfished in many areas such as the Persian Gulf and Indonesia. It is caught using trawls, although handlines and bottom longlines are also used. Some of the fish landed are exported to international markets. In southern China, this species is grown in mariculture. Although it has been overfished and the population has declined in some areas in others, such as Australia, fishing is strictly regulated, and populations are stable so the IUCN has assessed the species as Least Concern.
