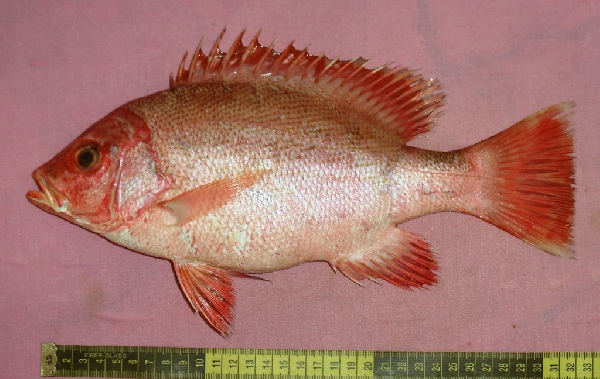

Conservation status
- Least Concern (IUCN 3.1)

Scientific classification
- Kingdom: Animalia
- Phylum: Chordata
- Class: Actinopterygii
- Order: Acanthuriformes
- Family: Lutjanidae
- Genus: Lutjanus
- Species: L. erythropterus

Binomial name
- Lutjanus erythropterus Bloch, 1790

Synonyms
- Mesoprion rubellus Cuvier, 1828; Mesoprion chirtah Cuvier, 1828; Lutjanus chirtah (Cuvier, 1828); Mesoprion annularis Cuvier, 1828; Lutjanus annularis (Cuvier, 1828); Genyoroge macleayana Ramsay, 1883; Lutjanus longmani Whitley, 1937; Lutjanus altifrontalis W.L. Chan, 1970

= Lutjanus erythropterus =

Species of fish

Lutjanus erythropterus, the crimson snapper, crimson seaperch, high-brow sea-perch, Longman's sea perch, red bream, saddle-tailed perch, small-mouth nannygai or smallmouth sea perch is a species of marine ray-finned fish, a snapper belonging to the family Lutjanidae. It is found in the Pacific and Indian Oceans.

== Taxonomy ==
Lutjanus erythropterus was first formally described in 1790 by the German physician and zoologist Marcus Elieser Bloch with the type locality given as Nagasaki. The specific name is a compound of erythros meaning "red" and pterus meaning "fin", a reference to the red median fins.

== Description ==
Lutjanus erythropterus has a moderately deep body which has a standard length of around two and half times its depth with a steeply sloped head and a large eye. The knob and incision on the preoperculum are weakly developed. The vomerine teeth are arranged a crescent shape with no rearwards extension and there are no teeth on the smooth tongue. The dorsal fin contains 11 spines and 12–14 soft rays and the anal fin has 3 spines and 8–9 soft rays. The long pectoral fins extend to the level of the anus and contains 17 rays. The caudal fin is truncate. The maximum total length recorded for this species is 81.6 cm (32.1 in) although 45 cm (18 in) is more typical. The colour of the adults is pinklish-red to silver, may have a darker red posterior margin on the caudal fin and a light vertical bar behind head.

== Distribution and habitat ==
Lutjanus erythropterus has an Indo-Pacific distribution. Its distribution extends from the Gulf of Oman east to the Admiralty Islands of Papua New Guinea, south to northern Australia and north to southern Japan. This species is likely to be associated with silty substrates in deeper waters, but is sometimes recorded forming schools over reefs and wrecks at depths greater than 20 m (66 ft). Juveniles, once they have attained a length of 2.5 cm (0.98 in), settle in shallow waters where there are muddy substrates, sometimes entering estuaries.

== Biology ==
Lutjanus erythropterus is mainly nocturnal, foraging during the night mainly for fish but also for crustaceans, cephalopods and other benthic invertebrates. They spawn in all months of the year in Australia and Indonesia. It is a relatively slow-growing and long-lived species with a maximum lifespan of 42 years.

== Fisheries and conservation ==
Lutjanus erythropterus is considered to be a high quality eating fish which appears in markets on a regular basis, albeit in small quantities. It is caught using handlines and bottom trawls and is targeted alongside the Malabar blood snapper (Lutjanus malabaricus) in Australia by both recreational anglers and commercial fisheries. It is also a quarry species in Indonesia and the Papua New Guinea for recreational, artisanal and commercial fisheries and part of the catch is exported to be sold internationally, in fact, it is a commercial fishery quarry in many parts of its range. In southern China it is being farmed in aquaculture. The crimson snapper has a wide distribution and a stable population and is strictly protected in some areas and so the IUCN classifies it as Least Concern.
