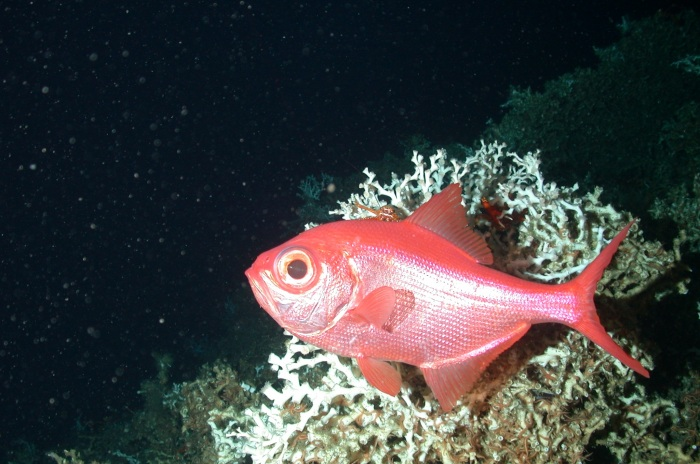
- Alfonsino (Beryx decadactylus)

Scientific classification
- Domain: Eukaryota
- Kingdom: Animalia
- Phylum: Chordata
- Class: Actinopterygii
- Order: Beryciformes
- Suborder: Berycoidei
- Family: Berycidae; R. T. Lowe, 1843

Genera
- †Argilloberyx; Beryx; Centroberyx †Nishiberyx

= Berycidae =

Berycidae Temporal range: Paleocene–present

Family of fishes

Berycidae is a small family of deep-sea fishes, related to the squirrelfishes. The family includes the alfonsinos and the nannygais.

Berycids are found in both temperate and tropical waters around the world, between 10 and 1,300 m (33 and 4,265 ft) in depth, though mainly greater than 100 m (330 ft). They are typically red in colour, and measure up to 1 m (3.3 ft) in length. Distinguishing features include spiny scales and large eyes and mouths.

The earliest fossils are of Centroberyx from the Paleocene, though potential earlier records are known from the Campanian.
