= Treaties of the European Union =

- Front page of an EU document containing the consolidated treaties and documents which comprise the legal basis of the EU
- Location: Italian Ministry of Foreign Affairs
- Purpose: Establishing the laws and principles under which the European Union is governed

The Treaties of the European Union are a set of international treaties between the European Union (EU) member states which sets out the EU's constitutional basis. They establish the various EU institutions together with their remit, procedures and objectives. The EU can only act within the competences granted to it through these treaties and amendment to the treaties requires the agreement and ratification (according to their national procedures) of every single signatory.

Two core functional treaties, the Treaty on European Union (originally signed in Maastricht in 1992, The Maastricht Treaty) and the Treaty on the Functioning of the European Union (originally signed in Rome in 1957 as the Treaty establishing the European Economic Community i.e. The Treaty of Rome), lay out how the EU operates, and there are a number of satellite treaties which are interconnected with them. The treaties have been repeatedly amended by other treaties over the 65 years since they were first signed. The consolidated version of the two core treaties is regularly published by the European Commission.

Despite the withdrawal of the United Kingdom from the bloc in 2020, its name remains officially on some of the treaties (the SEA, Maastricht, Amsterdam, Nice and Lisbon and all accession treaties between 1972 and 2011) as it was part of the consultation and ratification process as a member state at the time those treaties were drawn up, though the country is no longer legally bound by them itself. This can only be altered by a future amendment to the treaties.

== Content ==
The two principal treaties on which the EU is based are the Treaty on European Union (TEU; Maastricht Treaty, effective since 1993) and the Treaty on the Functioning of the European Union (TFEU; Treaty of Rome, effective since 1958). These main treaties (plus their attached protocols and declarations) have been altered by amending treaties at least once a decade since they each came into force, the latest being the Treaty of Lisbon which came into force in 2009. The Lisbon Treaty also made the Charter of Fundamental Rights legally binding, though it remains a separate document.

=== Treaty on European Union ===
Following the preamble the treaty text is divided into six parts.

Title 1, Common Provisions

The first deals with common provisions. Article 1 establishes the European Union on the basis of the European Community and lays out the legal value of the treaties. The second article states that the EU is "founded on the values of respect for human dignity, freedom, democracy, equality, the rule of law and respect for human rights, including the rights of persons belonging to minorities". The member states share a "society in which pluralism, non-discrimination, tolerance, justice, solidarity and equality between women and men prevail".

Article 3 then states the aims of the EU in six points. The first is simply to promote peace, European values and its citizens' well-being. The second relates to free movement with external border controls are in place. Point 3 deals with the internal market. Point 4 establishes the euro. Point 5 states the EU shall promote its values, contribute to eradicating poverty, observe human rights and respect the charter of the United Nations. The final sixth point states that the EU shall pursue these objectives by "appropriate means" according with its competences given in the treaties.

Article 4 relates to member states' sovereignty and obligations. Article 5 sets out the principles of conferral, subsidiarity and proportionality with respect to the limits of its powers. Article 6 binds the EU to the Charter of Fundamental Rights of the European Union and the European Convention on Human Rights. Article 7 deals with the suspension of a member state and article 8 deals with establishing close relations with neighbouring states.

Title 2, Provisions on democratic principles

Article 9 establishes the equality of national citizens and citizenship of the European Union. Article 10 declares that the EU is founded in representative democracy and that decisions must be taken as closely as possible to citizens. It makes reference to European political parties and how citizens are represented: directly in the parliament and by their governments in the council and European Council – accountable to national parliaments. Article 11 establishes government transparency, declares that broad consultations must be made and introduces provision for a petition where at least 1 million citizens may petition the commission to legislate on a matter. Article 12 gives national parliaments limited involvement in the legislative process.

Title 3, Provisions on the institutions

Article 13 establishes the institutions in the following order and under the following names: the European Parliament, the European Council, the Council, the European Commission, the Court of Justice of the European Union, the European Central Bank and the Court of Auditors. It obliges co-operation between these and limits their competencies to the powers within the treaties.

Article 14 deals with the workings of Parliament and its election, article 15 with the European Council and its president, article 16 with the council and its configurations and article 17 with the commission and its appointment. Article 18 establishes the High Representative of the Union for Foreign Affairs and Security Policy and article 19 establishes the Court of Justice.

Title 4, Provisions on enhanced cooperations

Title 4 has only one article which allows a limited number of member states to co-operate within the EU if others are blocking integration in that field.

Title 5, General provisions on the Union's external action and specific provisions on the Common Foreign and Security Policy

Chapter 1 of this title includes articles 21 and 22. Article 21 deals with the principles that outline EU foreign policy; including compliance with the UN charter, promoting global trade, humanitarian support and global governance. Article 22 gives the European Council, acting unanimously, control over defining the EU's foreign policy.

Chapter 2 is further divided into sections. The first, common provisions, details the guidelines and functioning of the EU's foreign policy, including establishment of the European External Action Service and member state's responsibilities. Section 2, articles 42 to 46, deal with military cooperation (including Permanent Structured Cooperation and mutual defence).

Title 6, Final provisions

Article 47 establishes a legal personality for the EU. Article 48 deals with the method of treaty amendment; specifically the ordinary and simplified revision procedures. Article 49 deals with applications to join the EU and article 50 with withdrawal. Article 51 deals with the protocols attached to the treaties and article 52 with the geographic application of the treaty. Article 53 states the treaty is in force for an unlimited period, article 54 deals with ratification and 55 with the different language versions of the treaties.

=== Treaty on the Functioning of the European Union ===
The Treaty on the Functioning of the European Union goes into deeper detail on the role, policies and operation of the EU. It is split into seven parts.

Part 1, Principles

In principles, article 1 establishes the basis of the treaty and its legal value. Articles 2 to 6 outline the competencies of the EU according to the level of powers accorded in each area. Articles 7 to 14 set out social principles, articles 15 and 16 set out public access to documents and meetings and article 17 states that the EU shall respect the status of religious, philosophical and non-confessional organisations under national law.

Part 2, Non-discrimination and citizenship of the Union

The second part begins with article 18 which outlaws, within the limitations of the treaties, discrimination on the basis of nationality. Article 19 states the EU will "combat discrimination based on sex, racial or ethnic origin, religion or belief, disability, age or sexual orientation". Articles 20 to 24 establishes EU citizenship and accords rights to it; to free movement, consular protection from other states, vote and stand in local and European elections, right to petition Parliament and the European Ombudsman and to contact and receive a reply from EU institutions in their own language. Article 25 requires the commission to report on the implementation of these rights every three years.

Part 3, Union policies and internal actions

Part 3 on policies and actions is divided by area into the following titles: the internal market; the free movement of goods, including the customs union; agriculture and fisheries; free movement of people, services and capital; the area of freedom, justice and security, including police and justice co-operation; transport policy; competition, taxation and harmonisation of regulations (note Article 101 and Article 102); economic and monetary policy, including articles on the euro; employment policy; the European Social Fund; education, vocational training, youth and sport policies; cultural policy; public health; consumer protection; Trans-European Networks; industrial policy; economic, social and territorial cohesion (reducing disparities in development); research and development and space policy; environmental policy; energy policy; tourism; civil protection; and administrative co-operation.

Part 4, Association of the overseas countries and territories

Part 4 deals with association of overseas territories. Article 198 sets the objective of association as promoting the economic and social development of those associated territories as listed in annex 2. The following articles elaborate on the form of association such as customs duties.

Part 5, External action by the Union

Part 5 deals with EU foreign policy. Article 205 states that external actions must be in accordance with the principles laid out in Chapter 1 Title 5 of the Treaty on European Union. Article 206 and 207 establish the common commercial (external trade) policy of the EU. Articles 208 to 214 deal with cooperation on development and humanitarian aid for third countries. Article 215 deals with sanctions while articles 216 to 219 deal with procedures for establishing international treaties with third countries. Article 220 instructs the High Representative and Commission to engage in appropriate cooperation with other international organisations and article 221 establishes the EU delegations. Article 222, the Solidarity clause states that members shall come to the aid of a fellow member who is subject to a terrorist attack, natural disaster or man-made disaster. This includes the use of military force.

Part 6, Institutional and financial provisions

Part 6 elaborates on the institutional provisions in the Treaty on European Union. As well as elaborating on the structures, articles 288 to 299 outline the forms of legislative acts and procedures of the EU. Articles 300 to 309 establish the European Economic and Social Committee, the Committee of the Regions and the European Investment Bank. Articles 310 to 325 outline the EU budget. Finally, articles 326 to 334 establishes provision for enhanced co-operation.

Part 7, General and final provisions

Part 7 deals with final legal points, such as territorial and temporal application, the seat of institutions (to be decided by member states, but this is enacted by a protocol attached to the treaties), immunities and the effect on treaties signed before 1958 or the date of accession.

=== Protocols, annexes and declarations ===
There are 37 protocols, 2 annexes and 65 declarations that are attached to the treaties to elaborate details, often in connection with a single country, without being in the full legal text.

Protocols

- 1: on the role of National Parliaments in the European Union
- 2: on the application of the principles of subsidiarity and proportionality
- 3: on the statute of the Court of Justice of the European Union
- 4: on the statute of the European System of Central Banks and of the European Central Bank
- 5: on the statute of the European Investment Bank
- 6: on the location of the seats of the institutions and of certain bodies, offices, agencies and departments of the European Union
- 7: on the privileges and immunities of the European Union
- 8: relating to Article 6(2) of the Treaty on European Union on the accession of the Union to the European Convention on the Protection of Human Rights and Fundamental Freedoms
- 9: on the decision of the Council relating to the implementation of Article 16(4) of the Treaty on European Union and Article 238(2) of the Treaty on the Functioning of the European Union between 1 November 2014 and 31 March 2017 on the one hand, and as from 1 April 2017 on the other
- 10: on permanent structured cooperation established by Article 42 of the Treaty on European Union
- 11: on Article 42 of the Treaty on European Union
- 12: on the excessive deficit procedure
- 13: on the convergence criteria
- 14: on the Euro Group
- 15: on certain provisions relating to the United Kingdom of Great Britain and Northern Ireland
- 16: on certain provisions relating to Denmark
- 17: on Denmark
- 18: on France
- 19: on the Schengen acquis integrated into the framework of the European Union
- 20: on the application of certain aspects of Article 26 of the Treaty on the Functioning of the European Union to the United Kingdom and to Ireland
- 21: on the position of the United Kingdom and Ireland in respect of the area of freedom, security and justice
- 22: on the position of Denmark
- 23: on external relations of the Member States with regard to the crossing of external borders
- 24: on asylum for nationals of Member States of the European Union
- 25: on the exercise of shared competence
- 26: on services of general interest
- 27: on the internal market and competition
- 28: on economic, social and territorial cohesion
- 29: on the system of public broadcasting in the Member States
- 30: on the application of the Charter of Fundamental Rights of the European Union to Poland and to the United Kingdom
- 31: concerning imports into the European Union of petroleum products refined in the Netherlands Antilles
- 32: on the acquisition of property in Denmark
- 33: concerning Article 157 of the Treaty on the Functioning of the European Union
- 34: on special arrangements for Greenland
- 35: on Article 40.3.3 of the Constitution of Ireland
- 36: on transitional provisions
- 37: on the financial consequences of the expiry of the ECSC treaty and on the Research fund for Coal and Steel

Annexes

- Annex I lists agricultural and marine produce covered by the Common Agricultural Policy and the Common Fisheries Policy.
- Annex II lists the overseas countries and territories associated with the EU.

Declarations

There are 65 declarations attached to the EU treaties. As examples, these include the following. Declaration 1 affirms that the charter, gaining legal force, reaffirms rights under the European Convention and does not allow the EU to act beyond its conferred competencies. Declaration 4 allocates an extra MEP to Italy. Declaration 7 outlines Council voting procedures to become active after 2014. Declaration 17 asserts the primacy of EU law. Declaration 27 reasserts that holding a legal personality does not entitle the EU to act beyond its competencies. Declaration 43 allows Mayotte to change to the status of outermost region.

=== Euratom ===
As well as the two main treaties, their protocols and the Charter of Fundamental Rights; the Treaty Establishing a European Atomic Energy Community (Euratom) is still in force as a separate treaty.

Title one outlines the tasks of Euratom. Title two contains the core of the treaty on how cooperation in the field is to take place. Title three outlines institutional provisions and has largely been subsumed by the European Union treaties. Title four is on financial provisions and title five on the general and title six is on final provisions.

== Amendment and ratification ==
The treaties can be changed in three different ways. The ordinary revision procedure is essentially the traditional method by which the treaties have been amended and involves holding a full inter-governmental conference. The simplified revision procedure was established by the Treaty of Lisbon and only allows for changes which do not increase the power of the EU. While using the passerelle clause does involve amending the treaties, as such, it does allow for a change of legislative procedure in certain circumstances.

The ordinary revision procedure for amending treaties requires proposals from an institution to be lodged with the European Council. The President of the European Council can then either call a European Convention (composed of national governments, national parliamentarians, MEPs and representatives from the Commission) to draft the changes or draft the proposals in the European Council itself if the change is minor. They then proceed with an Intergovernmental Conference (IGC) which agrees the treaty which is then signed by all the national leaders and ratified by each state.

While this is the procedure that has been used for all treaties prior to the Lisbon Treaty, an actual European Convention (essentially, a constitutional convention) has only been called twice. First in the drafting of the Charter of Fundamental Rights with the European Convention of 1999–2000. Second with the Convention on the Future of Europe which drafted the Constitutional Treaty (which then formed the basis of the Lisbon Treaty). Previously, treaties had been drafted by civil servants.

The simplified revision procedure, which applies only to part three of the Treaty on the Functioning of the European Union and cannot increase the powers of the EU, sees changes simply agreed in the European Council by a decision before being ratified by each state. The amendment to article 136 TFEU makes use of the simplified revision procedure due to the small scope of its change.

Any reform to the legal basis of the EU must be ratified according to the procedures in each member state. All states are required to ratify it and lodge the instruments of ratification with the Government of Italy before the treaty can come into force in any respect. In some states, such as Ireland, this is usually a referendum as any change to that state's constitution requires one. In others, such as Belgium, referendums are constitutionally banned and the ratification must take place in its national parliament.

On some occasions, a state has failed to get a treaty passed by its public in a referendum. In the cases of Ireland and Denmark a second referendum was held after a number of concessions were granted. However, in the case of France and the Netherlands, the treaty was abandoned in favour of a treaty that would not prompt a referendum. In the case of Norway, where the treaty was their accession treaty, the treaty (hence, their membership) was also abandoned.

Treaties are also put before the European Parliament and while its vote is not binding, it is important; both the Belgian and Italian Parliaments said they would veto the Nice Treaty if the European Parliament did not approve it.

=== Minor amendments not requiring ratification ===
The treaties contain a passerelle clause which allows the European Council to unanimously agree to change the applicable voting procedure in the Council of Ministers to QMV and to change legislation adoption procedure from a special to the ordinary legislative procedure, provided that no national parliament objects. This procedure cannot be used for areas which have defence implications.

The fourth amendment procedure is for changing status of some of the special member state territories. The status of French, Dutch and Danish overseas territories can be changed more easily, by no longer requiring a full treaty revision. Instead, the European Council may, on the initiative of the member state concerned, change the status of an overseas country or territory (OCT) to an outermost region (OMR) or vice versa. This provision doesn't apply to special territories of the other member states.

Legend for below table: [Amending] – [Membership]

European Council decision type	Established/Amended	Agreed in	Agreed on	Effective from	Ceased
Changing status of French territory	Withdrawal of Saint-Barthélemy (OMR to OCT)	Brussels, BE	29 October 2010	1 January 2012	in force
Changing status of French territory	Enlarged to Mayotte (OCT to OMR)	Brussels, BE	11 July 2012	1 January 2014	in force

== Ratified treaties ==
Since the end of World War II, most sovereign European countries have entered into treaties and thereby co-operated and harmonised policies (or pooled sovereignty) in an increasing number of areas, in the European integration project or the construction of Europe (French: la construction européenne). The following timeline outlines the legal inception of the European Union (EU)—the principal framework for this unification. The EU inherited many of its present organisations, institutions, and responsibilities from the European Communities (EC), which were founded in the 1950s in the spirit of the Schuman Declaration.

Legend:
S: signing
F: entry into force
T: termination
E: expiry
de facto supersession
Rel. w/ EC/EU framework:
de facto inside
outside

European Union (EU)
[Cont.]
European Communities (EC)
(Pillar I)

European Atomic Energy Community (EAEC or EURATOM)

[Cont.]

/ / / European Coal and Steel Community (ECSC)

(Distr. of competences)

European Economic Community (EEC)

Schengen Rules
European Community (EC)
TREVI
Justice and Home Affairs (JHA, pillar III)

/ North Atlantic Treaty Organisation (NATO)
[Cont.]
Police and Judicial Co-operation in Criminal Matters (PJCC, pillar III)

Anglo-French alliance
[Defence arm handed to NATO]
European Political Co-operation (EPC)

Common Foreign and Security Policy
(CFSP, pillar II)
Western Union (WU)
/ Western European Union (WEU)
[Tasks defined following the WEU's 1984 reactivation handed to the EU]

[Social, cultural tasks handed to CoE]
[Cont.]

Council of Europe (CoE)
Entente Cordiale
S: 8 April 1904
Dunkirk Treaty (Note: Although not EU treaties per se, these treaties affected the development of the EU defence arm, a main part of the CFSP. The Franco-British alliance established by the Dunkirk Treaty was de facto superseded by WU. The CFSP pillar was bolstered by some of the security structures that had been established within the remit of the 1955 Modified Brussels Treaty (MBT). The Brussels Treaty was terminated in 2011, consequently dissolving the WEU, as the mutual defence clause that the Lisbon Treaty provided for EU was considered to render the WEU superfluous. The EU thus de facto superseded the WEU.)
S: 4 March 1947
F: 8 September 1947
E: 8 September 1997
Brussels Treaty
S: 17 March 1948
F: 25 August 1948
T: 30 June 2011
London and Washington treaties
S: 5 May/4 April 1949
F: 3 August/24 August 1949
Paris treaties: ECSC and EDC (Note: Plans to establish a European Political Community (EPC) were shelved following the French failure to ratify the Treaty establishing the European Defence Community (EDC). The EPC would have combined the ECSC and the EDC.)
S: 18 April 1951/27 May 1952
F: 23 July 1952/?
E: 23 July 2002/—
Protocol Modifying and
Completing the Brussels Treaty
S: 23 October 1954
F: 6 May 1955
Rome treaties: EEC and EAEC
S: 25 March 1957
F: 1 January 1958
WEU-CoE agreement
S: 21 October 1959
F: 1 January 1960
Brussels (Merger) Treaty (Note: The European Communities obtained common institutions and a shared legal personality (i.e. ability to e.g. sign treaties in their own right).)
S: 8 April 1965
F: 1 July 1967
Davignon report
S: 27 October 1970
European Council conclusions
S: 2 December 1975
Single European Act (SEA)
S: 17/28 February 1986
F: 1 July 1987
Schengen Agreement and Convention
S: 14 June 1985/19 June 1990
F: 26 March 1995
Maastricht Treaty (Note: The treaties of Maastricht and Rome form the EU's legal basis, and are also referred to as the Treaty on European Union (TEU) and the Treaty on the Functioning of the European Union (TFEU), respectively. They are amended by secondary treaties.) (Note: Between the EU's founding in 1993 and consolidation in 2009, the union consisted of three pillars, the first of which were the European Communities. The other two pillars consisted of additional areas of cooperation that had been added to the EU's remit.)
S: 7 February 1992
F: 1 November 1993
Amsterdam Treaty
S: 2 October 1997
F: 1 May 1999
Nice Treaty
S: 26 February 2001
F: 1 February 2003
Lisbon Treaty (Note: The consolidation meant that the EU inherited the European Communities' legal personality and that the pillar system was abolished, resulting in the EU framework as such covering all policy areas. Executive/legislative power in each area was instead determined by a distribution of competencies between EU institutions and member states. This distribution, as well as treaty provisions for policy areas in which unanimity is required and qualified majority voting is possible, reflects the depth of EU integration as well as the EU's partly supranational and partly intergovernmental nature.)
S: 13 December 2007
F: 1 December 2009

Legend for below table: [Founding] – [Amending] – [Membership]

Treaty	Established/Amended	Signed in	Signed on	Effective from	Ceased
ECSC Treaty ^{source text}	European Coal and Steel Community	Paris, FR	18 April 1951	23 July 1952	23 July 2002
Treaty amending the Treaty establishing the European Coal and Steel Community	Amended Previous: Amended the ECSC treaty to take into account the transfer of Saarland from France to Germany	Luxembourg, LU	27 October 1956	9 October 1958	23 July 2002
EEC Treaty (Treaty of Rome) ^{source text}	European Economic Community	Rome, IT	25 March 1957	1 January 1958	in force
Euratom Treaty ^{source text}	European Atomic Energy Community	Rome, IT	25 March 1957	1 January 1958	in force
Convention on certain institutions common to the European Communities	Amended Previous: Established a common Assembly, a common Court of Justice and a common Economic and Social Committee	Rome, IT	25 March 1957	1 January 1958	1 May 1999
Netherlands Antilles Convention ^{source text}	OCT status for the Netherlands Antilles	Brussels, BE	13 November 1962	1 October 1964	in force
Merger Treaty ^{source text}	Amended Previous: Executives of ECSC and EAEC combined with those of the EEC.	Brussels, BE	8 April 1965	1 July 1967	1 May 1999
First Budgetary Treaty	Amended Previous: Partial budgetary powers to Parliament	Luxembourg, LU	22 April 1970	1 January 1971	in force
Treaty of Accession 1972	Enlarged to Denmark, Ireland and the United Kingdom	Brussels, BE	22 January 1972	1 January 1973	in force
Treaty amending certain provisions of the Protocol on the Statute of the European Investment Bank	Amended Previous: Protocol on the Statute of the European Investment Bank	Brussels, BE	10 July 1975	1 October 1977	in force
Second Budgetary Treaty	Amended Previous: Greater budgetary powers to Parliament Established the Court of Auditors (see article for all changes).	Brussels, BE	22 July 1975	1 June 1977	in force
Treaty of Accession 1979	Enlarged to Greece	Athens, GR	28 May 1979	1 January 1981	in force
Greenland Treaty ^{source text}	Withdrawal of Greenland	Brussels, BE	13 March 1984	1 February 1985	in force
Treaty of Accession 1985	Enlarged to Spain and Portugal	Madrid, ES; Lisbon, PT	12 June 1985	1 January 1986	in force
Single European Act ^{source text}	Amended Previous: Introduced the Single Market and European Political Cooperation	Luxembourg, LU; The Hague, NL	17 February 1986; 28 February 1986	1 July 1987	in force
Treaty of Maastricht ^{source text} (Treaty on European Union)	European Union Amended Previous: EEC became European Community pillar of EU. Intergovernmental pillars of CFSP and JHA established.	Maastricht, NL	7 February 1992	1 November 1993	in force
Act amending the Protocol on the Statute of the European Investment Bank empowering the Board of Governors to establish a European Investment Fund	Established the European Investment Fund	Brussels, BE	25 March 1993	1 May 1994	in force
Treaty of Accession 1994	Enlarged to Austria, Finland and Sweden	Corfu, GR	24 June 1994	1 January 1995	in force
Treaty of Amsterdam ^{source text}	Amended Previous: Introduced the High Representative, transferred powers from JHA pillar to EC and integrated the Schengen Agreement (see article for all changes).	Amsterdam, NL	2 October 1997	1 May 1999	in force
Treaty of Nice ^{source text}	Amended Previous: Prepared the EU to cope with enlargement (see article for all changes).	Nice, FR	26 February 2001	1 February 2003	in force
Treaty of Accession 2003	Enlarged to: Czech Republic, Estonia, Cyprus, Latvia, Lithuania, Hungary, Malta, Poland, Slovenia and Slovakia	Athens, GR	16 April 2003	1 May 2004	in force
Treaty of Accession 2005	Enlarged to Bulgaria and Romania	Luxembourg, LU	25 April 2005	1 January 2007	in force
Treaty of Lisbon ^{source text}	Amended Previous: Created European Council President, enhanced foreign policy, abolished pillar system, expanded Parliament's powers and QMV, made Rights charter binding.	Lisbon, PT	13 December 2007	1 December 2009	in force
Protocol on European Parliament seats ^{source text}	Amended Protocol 36: Appointed 18 new members of the EP until the 2014 election, who would have been elected in 2009 if the Treaty of Lisbon had been in force. No seats were abolished, so the number of the MEPs temporarily increased to 754.	Brussels, BE	23 June 2010	1 December 2011	in force
TFEU ESM amendment ^{source text}	Amended TFEU Article 136: Authorised the establishment of the European Stability Mechanism.	Brussels, BE	25 March 2011	1 May 2013	in force
Treaty of Accession 2011 ^{source text}	Enlarged to Croatia	Brussels, BE	9 December 2011	1 July 2013	in force
Irish protocol on the Lisbon Treaty	Formalising the Irish guarantees	Brussels, BE	16 May 2012 – 13 June 2012	1 December 2014	in force
Brexit Agreement	Withdrawal of the United Kingdom	Brussels, BE; London, UK	24 January 2020	1 February 2020	in force

== Abandoned treaties ==
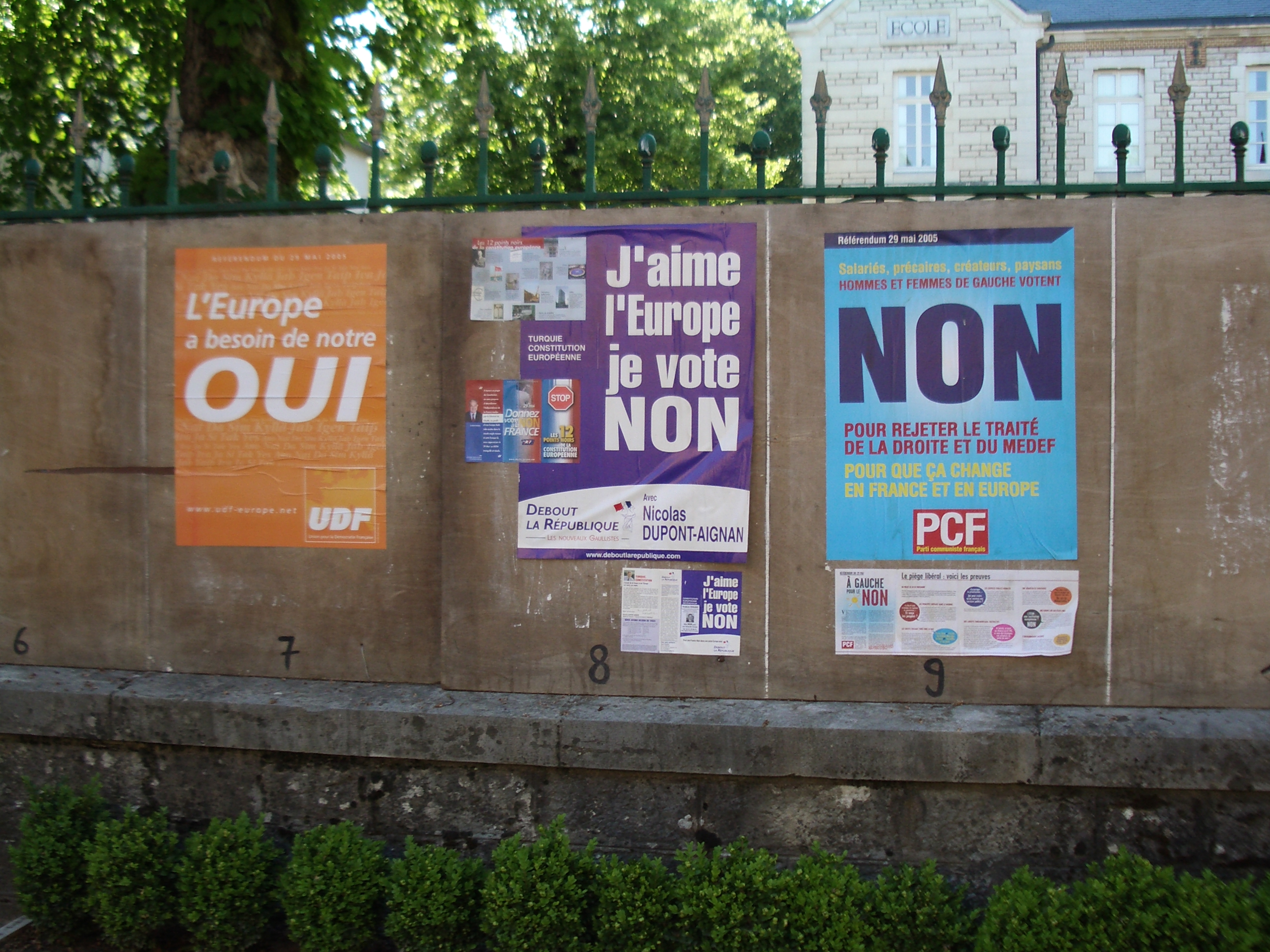
The European Constitution failed due to negative votes in two member states.

1972 and 1994 Treaties of Accession of Norway

Norway applied to join the European Communities/Union on two occasions. Both times a national referendum rejected membership, leading Norway to abandon their ratification of the treaty of accession. The first treaty was signed in Brussels on 22 January 1972 and the second in Corfu on 24 June 1994.

Treaty establishing a Constitution for Europe (the European Constitution)

The European Constitution was a treaty that would have repealed and consolidated all previous overlapping treaties (except the Euratom treaty) into a single document. It also made changes to voting systems, simplified the structure of the EU and advanced co-operation in foreign policy. The treaty was signed in Rome on 29 October 2004 and was due to come into force on 1 November 2006 if it was ratified by all member states. However, this did not occur, with France rejecting the document in a national referendum on 29 May 2005 and then the Netherlands in their own referendum on 1 June 2005. Although it had been ratified by a number of member states, following a "period of reflection", the constitution in that form was scrapped and replaced by the Treaty of Lisbon.

== Related treaties ==
Although not formally part of European Union law, several closely related treaties have been signed outside the framework of the EU and its predecessors between the member states because the EU lacked authority to act in the field. After the EU obtained such autonomy, many of these conventions were gradually replaced by EU instruments.

Following on from the success of the Treaty of Paris, establishing the European Coal and Steel Community, efforts were made to allow West Germany to rearm within the framework of a common European military structure. The Treaty instituting the European Defence Community was signed by the six members on 27 May 1952, but it never entered into force as it was not ratified by France and Italy. The Common Assembly also began drafting a treaty for a European Political Community to ensure democratic accountability of the new army, but it was abandoned when the Defence Community treaty was rejected.

Other early examples include the Statute of the European School of 1957, the Naples Convention of 1967 on customs cooperation, the Brussels Convention of 1968 on jurisdiction in civil matters, the Convention setting up a European University Institute on 1972 and the amending Convention of 1992 to the EUI Convention, the Agreement on the Suppression of Terrorism of 1979, the Rome Convention of 1980 on contractual obligations, the Convention on double jeopardy of 1987, the Agreement on the application of the Council of Europe Convention on the Transfer of Sentenced Persons of 1987, the Convention abolishing the legalization of documents of 1987, the Agreement on the simplification and modernization of extradition requests of 1989, the Dublin Convention of 1990 on asylum, the Arbitration convention of 1990 on double taxation, the Maintenance Convention of 1990, the Transfer of Criminal Proceedings Agreement of 1990, the Convention on the Enforcement of Foreign Criminal Sentences of 1991, the Eurovignette Agreement of 1994, and the Convention Defining the Statute of the European Schools of 1994. Additionally, the convention on mutual recognition of companies and legal persons was signed in 1968 but never entered into force. Likewise, the Community Patent Convention of 1975 and the Agreement relating to Community patents of 1989, which amended the 1975 Convention never entered into force.

Article K.3 of the Maastricht Treaty, which entered into force in 1993, authorised the European Communities to "draw up conventions which it shall recommend to the Member States for adoption in accordance with their respective constitutional requirements" under the newly created Justice and Home Affairs pillar, which was organised on an intergovernmental basis. Concluded under these provisions were the Naples II Convention of 1997 on customs cooperation, the conventions on simplified extradition procedures of 1995, the Europol Convention of 1995 establishing Europol, the PFI Convention of 1995 on fraud, the Customs Information System Convention of 1995, the Insolvency Convention of 1995, the Convention relating to extradition of 1996, the convention on the fight against corruption of 1997, the Service Convention of 1997 on the service of documents, the convention on matrimonial matters of 1998, the convention on driving disqualifications of 1998, and the convention on mutual assistance in criminal matters of 2000. Numerous protocols to these agreements have also been concluded. The JHA was integrated into the EC structures as the area of freedom, security and justice with the Lisbon Treaty's entry into force in 2009, which has allowed a number of these Conventions to be replaced by EU Regulations or Decisions.

Finally, several treaties have been concluded between a subset of EU member states due to a lack of unanimity. The Schengen Treaty and Convention of 1985 and 1990 respectively were agreed to in this manner, but were subsequently incorporated into EU law by the Amsterdam Treaty with the remaining EU member states that had not signed the treaty being given an opt-out from implementing it. Others agreements signed as intergovernmental treaties outside the EU legal framework include the EU status of forces agreement of 2003, the EU claims agreement of 2004, the Treaty of Strasbourg of 2004 establishing the Eurocorps, the Treaty of Velsen of 2007 establishing the European Gendarmerie Force, the Prüm Convention of 2005 on the fight against terrorism, the convention on centralised customs clearance of 2009, the Agreement on the protection of classified information of 2011, the Treaty Establishing the European Stability Mechanism of 2012 establishing the European Stability Mechanism, the European Fiscal Compact of 2012 on fiscal rules in the eurozone, the Agreement on a Unified Patent Court of 2013 establishing the Unified Patent Court, and the Single Resolution Fund Agreement of 2014 establishing the Single Resolution Fund. However, all these agreements are open to accession by EU member states. The text of the Prum Convention, Fiscal Compact and Single Resolution Fund Agreement state that the intention of the signatories is to incorporate the treaty's provisions into EU structures and that EU law should take precedence over the treaty. A TFEU amendment was ratified which authorises the creation of the ESM, giving it a legal basis in the EU treaties.

An updated EMU reform plan issued in June 2015 by the five presidents of the council, European Commission, ECB, Eurogroup and European Parliament outlined a roadmap for integrating the Fiscal Compact and Single Resolution Fund agreement into the framework of EU law by June 2017, and the intergovernmental European Stability Mechanism by 2025. Proposals by the European Commission to incorporate the substance of the Fiscal Compact into EU law and create a European Monetary Fund to replace the ESM were published in December 2017. On 30 November 2020 the finance ministers at the Eurogroup agreed to amend the treaties establishing the ESM and Single Resolution Fund, to be ratified in 2021 by all Eurozone member states. The reform proposal was blocked for months because of the veto of the Italian government. The proposed amendments include:

- The establishment of the ESM as a "backstop" to the Single Resolution Fund (SRF).
- Reform of ESM Governance
- The precautionary financial assistance instruments
- Clarifications and expansions of the ESM mandate on economic governance;

Title 3 of the Fiscal Compact was incorporated into EU law as part of the economic governance framework reforms (Regulation (EU) 2024/1263, Council Directive (EU) 2024/1265 and Council Regulation (EU) 2024/1264) which entered into force as of 4 April 2024.

=== List ===
Legend for below table: [in force] – [replaced]

Ratified treaties

Ratified treaties
Treaty	Subject matter	Signed in	Signed on	Parties	Effective from	Status
Statute of the European School	European Schools	Luxemburg, LU	1 September 1957	13 EU states	22 February 1960	Repealed (Note: Replaced by the Convention defining the Statute of the European schools on 1 October 2002.)
Naples Convention	Customs cooperation	Rome, IT	7 September 1967	13 EU states	1 February 1970	Repealed (Note: Replaced by the Naples II Convention on 23 June 2009.)
Brussels Convention (Protocol)	Jurisdiction in civil matters	Brussels, BE	27 September 1968	15 EU states	1 February 1973	in force (Note: Superseded by the Brussels Regulation on 1 March 2002 for the territory covered by the EU treaties for all member states except Denmark, and by a bilateral agreement with Denmark on 1 July 2007.)
Convention setting up a European University Institute	European University Institute	Florence, IT	19 April 1972	25 EU states EU non-party: CZ, HU, LT	1 February 1975	in force (Note: Amended by the Convention revising the Convention setting up a European University Institute of 1992, which entered into force in 2007 when the last contracting state ratified the Convention.)
Rome Convention	Contractual obligations	Rome, IT	19 June 1980	27 EU states	1 April 1991	in force (Note: Superseded by the Rome I Regulation on 17 December 2009 for the territory covered by the EU treaties for all member states except the United Kingdom and Denmark. The United Kingdom subsequently decided to opt-in to the Rome I Regulation, effective 17 December 2009.)
Schengen Agreement	Established open borders	Schengen, LU	14 June 1985	26 EU states (Note: Iceland, Liechtenstein, Norway, Switzerland have also ratified agreements to apply some of the provisions of this agreement.); EU non-party: IE, UK (Note: Ireland and the United Kingdom have an opt-out from participating in the Agreement.)	26 March 1995	in force, integrated as Union law (Note: Incorporated into Union Law in 1999 through a Protocol to the Treaty of Amsterdam.)
Dublin Convention	Asylum	Dublin, IE	15 June 1990	23 EU states	1 September 1997	Replaced (Note: Replaced by the Dublin II Regulation on 17 March 2003 for all member states except Denmark, and by a bilateral agreement with Denmark on 1 April 2006.)
Schengen Convention	Implemented the Schengen Agreement	Schengen, LU	19 June 1990	26 EU states EU non-party: IE, UK	1 September 1993	in force, integrated as Union law
Arbitration convention	Elimination of double taxation	Brussels, BE	23 July 1990	All 28 EU states	1 January 1995	in force
Convention revising the Convention setting up a European University Institute	European University Institute	Florence, IT	17 September 1992	25 EU states EU non-party: CZ, HU, LT	1 May 2007	in force (Note: Amended the Convention setting up a European University Institute of 1992.)
Eurovignette Agreement	Vignette	Brussels, BE	9 February 1994	3 EU states (Note: Germany denounced the agreement in 2017, as did Belgium in 2019 and Denmark in 2024.)	1 January 1996	in force (Note: Based on Article 8 of the Eurovignette Directive.)
Convention on the European Schools	European Schools	Luxemburg, LU	21 June 1994	All 28 EU states	1 October 2002	in force
Europol Convention	Europol	Brussels, BE	26 July 1995	27 EU states	1 October 1998	Replaced (Note: Replaced by the Europol Decision on 1 January 2010.)
PFI Convention	Fraud	Brussels, BE	26 July 1995	All 28 EU states (Note: The United Kingdom subsequently opted out from participating in this convention as of 1 December 2014.)	17 October 2002	Replaced (Note: Replaced by the PIF Directive on 6 July 2019 for all member states except Denmark and the United Kingdom.)
Customs Information System Convention	Customs cooperation	Brussels, BE	26 July 1995	27 EU states	25 December 2005	Replaced (Note: Replaced by a Council Decision on 27 May 2011.)
Convention relating to extradition	Extradition	Dublin, IE	27 September 1996	21 EU states (Note: Iceland, Liechtenstein, Norway, Switzerland have also ratified agreements to apply the Schengen Acquis, including some of the provisions of this agreement.)	5 November 2019	Replaced (Note: Replaced by the European Arrest Warrant Decision for the territory covered by the EU treaties for all member states on 7 August 2002, and by a bilaterial agreement with Iceland and Norway on 1 November 2019.)
Convention on the fight against corruption	Corruption	Brussels, BE	26 May 1997	27 EU states EU non-party: MT	28 September 2005	in force (Note: Superseded by the Directive (EU) 2026/1021 on 31 May 2026 for all member states except Denmark.)
Naples II Convention	Customs cooperation	Brussels, BE	18 December 1997	All 28 EU states	23 June 2009	in force
Convention on Mutual Assistance in Criminal Matters	Cooperation on criminal matters	Brussels, BE	29 May 2000	26 EU states (Note: Iceland and Norway have also ratified an agreement to apply some of the provisions of this agreement.); EU non-parties: HR, (Note: Accession agreed to as part of Croatia's treaty of accession to the EU, but entry into force is pending a decision of the Council.) GR	23 August 2005	in force (Note: Partially replaced by the European Investigation Order on 21 May 2014 for all member states except Denmark and Ireland.)
EUCARIS Treaty	EUCARIS	Luxemburg, LU	26 June 2000	9 EU states	1 May 2009	in force
EU SOFA	Status of forces agreement	Brussels, BE	17 November 2003	All 28 EU states	1 April 2019	in force
Treaty of Strasbourg	Eurocorps	Brussels, BE	22 November 2004	5 EU states	26 February 2009	in force
Prüm Convention ^{source text}	Terrorism	Prüm, DE	27 May 2005	14 EU states	1 November 2006	in force (Note: Substance replaced by the Prüm Decisions on 26 August 2008. Iceland, Liechtenstein, Norway and Switzerland have also signed agreements to apply some of the provisions of these Decisions.)
Treaty of Velsen	European Gendarmerie Force	Velsen, NL	18 October 2007	8 EU states	1 June 2012	in force
Charter of Fundamental Rights of the European Union ^{source text}	Human rights	Strasbourg, FR	12 December 2007 (Note: Charter was originally solemnly proclaimed on 7 December 2000 by the European Parliament, the Council of Ministers and the European Commission. An amended version of the Charter was incorporated into Union Law in 2009 with the Treaty of Lisbon adding an Article to the Treaty on the European Union referencing it.)	26 EU states EU non-party: PL, UK (Note: Poland and the United Kingdom have an opt-out from participating in the Charter.)	1 December 2009	in force, integrated as Union law
Convention on centralised customs clearance	Customs clearance	Brussels, BE	10 March 2009	All 28 EU states	16 January 2019	in force
Agreement on the protection of classified information	Classified information	Brussels, BE	25 May 2011	All 28 EU states	1 December 2015	in force
Treaty Establishing the European Stability Mechanism ^{source text} (Amendment)	European Stability Mechanism	Brussels, BE	2 February 2012	All 21 eurozone states	27 September 2012	in force
European Fiscal Compact ^{source text}	Fiscal rules in the eurozone	Brussels, BE	2 March 2012	27 EU states EU non-party: UK	1 January 2013	in force (Note: Title 3 of the Fiscal Compact was incorporated into EU-law as part of the economic governance framework reforms (Regulation (EU) 2024/1263, Council Directive (EU) 2024/1265 and Council Regulation (EU) 2024/1264) as of 4 April 2024.)
Single Resolution Fund Agreement (Amendment)	Single Resolution Fund	Brussels, BE	21 May 2014	24 EU states (all 20 eurozone states)	1 January 2016	in force
Agreement for the Termination of Bilateral Investment Treaties	Bilateral investment treaty	Brussels, BE	5 May 2020	23 EU states EU non-party: AT, FI, IE, SE, UK (Note: Ireland has no remaining BIT with other EU member states in force, so the agreement is not relevant to it.)	29 August 2020	in force
Agreement on a Unified Patent Court ^{source text} (Protocols)	Unified Patent Court	Brussels, BE	19 February 2013	18 / 25 Signatories	1 June 2023	in force

Signed treaties

Signed treaties
Treaty	Subject matter	Signed in	Signed on	Ratification (of signatories)	Status
Treaty establishing the European Defence Community	European Defence Community	Paris, FR	27 May 1952	4 / 6	Abandoned
Convention on mutual recognition of companies and legal persons (Protocol)	Recognition of companies and legal persons	Brussels, BE	29 February 1968	5 / 6	Abandoned (Note: Concluded following the provisions of Article 220 of the Treaty establishing the European Economic Community of 1957 to clarify Articles 52 and 58 of the same treaty on the mutual recognition of companies. Article 220 was deleted by the 2007 Treaty of Lisbon amendments, with the latter two articles being renumbered Articles 49 and 54 in the Treaty on the Functioning of the European Union.)
Community Patent Convention (Protocol)	Patents	Luxembourg, LU	15 December 1975	7 / 9	Replaced (Note: Replaced by the Agreement relating to Community patents of 15 December 1989.)
Agreement on the Suppression of Terrorism	Terrorism	Dublin, IE	4 December 1979	5 / 9	Replaced (Note: Substance replaced by the European Arrest Warrant Decision for the territory covered by the EU treaties for all member states on 7 August 2002.)
Convention on double jeopardy	Double jeopardy	Brussels, BE	25 May 1987	9 / 13	Replaced (Note: Substance replaced by the Schengen Convention on 26 March 1995, which applies to all signatories and parties but is not yet effective in Ireland.)
Convention abolishing the legalization of documents	Legalization of documents	Brussels, BE	25 May 1987	8 / 14	Replaced (Note: Substance replaced by a Regulation on 16 February 2019.)
Agreement on the application of the Convention on the Transfer of Sentenced Persons	Convention on the Transfer of Sentenced Persons	Brussels, BE	25 May 1987	6 / 12	Replaced (Note: Substance replaced by a Council Framework Decision on 5 December 2011.)
Agreement on the simplification and modernization of extradition requests	Extradition	San Sebastián, ES	26 May 1989	9 / 13	Replaced (Note: Replaced by the European Arrest Warrant Decision for the territory covered by the EU treaties for all member states on 7 August 2002.)
Agreement relating to Community patents	Patents	Luxembourg, LU	15 December 1989	7 / 12	Abandoned (Note: Subject matter covered in the Agreement on a Unified Patent Court of 19 February 2013.)
Maintenance Convention	Child maintenance	Rome, IT	6 November 1990	5 / 12	Replaced (Note: Substance replaced by the Maintenance Regulation, which amended the Brussels Regulation, for all member states except the United Kingdom and Denmark on 18 June 2011. The United Kingdom subsequently decided to opt-in to the Maintenance Regulation, which was officially finalised on 12 June 2009. Denmark, which did not ratify the Maintenance Convention, participates in the Brussels Regulation by way of a bilateral agreement. It notified the Commission of its acceptance of the amendments to the Brussels Regulation made by the Maintenance Regulation on 14 January 2009, and therefore partially applies the maintenance regulation in so far as it amends the Brussels regulation on jurisdiction.)
Transfer of Criminal Proceedings Agreement	Transfer of criminal proceedings	Rome, IT	6 November 1990	2 / 9	Abandoned (Note: Substance proposed to be replaced by a Framework Decision in 2009.)
Convention on the Enforcement of Foreign Criminal Sentences	Criminal sentences	Brussels, BE	13 November 1991	5 / 12	Replaced (Note: Replaced by a Council Framework Decision on 5 December 2011.)
Convention on simplified extradition procedure	Extradition	Brussels, BE	10 March 1995	20 / 21 (Note: The United Kingdom subsequently opted out from participating in this convention as of 1 December 2014.) (Note: Iceland, Liechtenstein, Norway, Switzerland have also ratified agreements to apply the Schengen Acquis, including some of the provisions of this agreement.)	Replaced (Note: Replaced by the European Arrest Warrant Decision for the territory covered by the EU treaties for all member states on 7 August 2002, and by a bilaterial agreement with Iceland and Norway on 1 November 2019.)
Convention on Insolvency Proceedings	International insolvency	Brussels, BE (Note: Not signed by the UK)	November 23, 1995	0 / 14	Replaced (Note: Substance replaced by the Insolvency Regulation for all member states except Denmark on 31 May 2002.)
Service Convention	Service of documents	Brussels, BE	26 May 1997	1 / 15	Replaced (Note: Substance replaced by the Service Regulation for all member states except Denmark on 31 May 2001, and by a bilateral agreement with Denmark on 1 July 2007.)
Convention on matrimonial matters	Divorce and child custody	Brussels, BE	28 May 1998	0 / 15	Replaced (Note: Substance replaced by the Brussels II Regulation for all member states except Denmark on 1 March 2001.)
Convention on driving disqualifications	Driving disqualifications	Brussels, BE	17 June 1998	7 / 19	Repealed (Note: Repealed by a Regulation on 22 February 2016.)
EU claims agreement	Claims for damages during EU crisis management operations	Brussels, BE	28 April 2004	26 / 28	Under ratification
Treaty Establishing the European Stability Mechanism ^{source text}	European Stability Mechanism	Brussels, BE	11 July 2011	0 / 17	Replaced (Note: Replaced by revised version of the Treaty Establishing the European Stability Mechanism signed on 2 February 2012.)

== See also ==
- Law of the European Union
