= PFI =

PFI may stand for:

- Pay for inclusion (paid inclusion), charge by a search engine to include a Web site in its index
- Pellet Fuels Institute, trade association of the wood pellet fuel industry
- Percy FitzPatrick Institute of African Ornithology
- Performance Freediving International, a freediving organization
- PF International Kart Circuit, a kart circuit in England
- Popular Front of India, an Islamist organisation in India
- Port fuel injection (indirect injection), a type of fuel injection used in automobiles
- Practical Farmers of Iowa, an agriculture NGO in Iowa
- Pre-flight inspection, of an aircraft
- Private finance initiative, a way of funding public sector projects with private capital
- The Prize Fighter Inferno, a musical project of Coheed and Cambria frontman Claudio Sanchez
- Pro forma invoice, a billing document that is not a demand for payment but gives information about a shipment
- PFI Convention (Convention on the protection of the European Communities' financial interests), a multilateral EU treaty on fraud
- Perspektivnyi Frontovoy Istrebitel ("Perspective Frontline Fighter"), Soviet military aircraft; see Post-PFI Soviet/Russian aircraft projects
- PFIs, or Pharmaceutical Formulation Intermediates, a pharmaceutical term
- Press Freedom Index
