= Pringle v Government of Ireland =

Decision of the European Court of Justice

- Court: CJEU
- Full case name: Thomas Pringle v Government of Ireland and Others
- Decided: 27 November 2012
- Citation: (2012) C‑370/12

Pringle v Government of Ireland, (2012), C‑370/12, is a European Union law case which held the European Stability Mechanism (ESM) was lawful.

== Facts ==
Thomas Pringle, an anti-austerity Independent MP (Teachta Dála) in Ireland, claimed that the European Stability Mechanism was unlawful, because it exceeded the EU’s exclusive competence for monetary policy, and went beyond the Treaty on the Functioning of the European Union (TFEU) powers. The ESM was established by the ESM Treaty, signed by the euro area Member States on 2 February 2012. European Council Decision 2011/199/EU that revised Art 136(3)TFEU to contain the following text:

"The Member States whose currency is the euro may establish a stability mechanism to be activated if indispensable to safeguard the stability of the euro area as a whole. The granting of any required financial assistance under the mechanism will be made subject to strict conditionality."

Pringle claimed that amending the TFEU using only a council decision is illegal because the amendment alters the competencies delegated to the EU. According to EU treaty law, the simplified revision procedure uses only a decision, rather than a popular referendum or other legal actions as required by national constitutional processes, to amend the EU treaties. This procedure "can only be used when the planned change does not increase EU competences." Pringle argued that the revision in Decision 2011/199/EU was "inconsistent with provisions of the Treaties on which the EU is founded concerning economic and monetary union."

== Judgment ==
=== Irish High Court ===
In July 2012, High Court judge Mary Laffoy ruled that the ESM Treaty "is not incompatible with the Constitution and that an amendment of the Constitution approved of by the people in a referendum is not necessary before it can be ratified." This ruling, based in Irish national law, rebuked Pringle’s claims. However, the High Court also sent a preliminary reference to the ECJ to clarify whether the revision proposed in Council Decision 2011/199/EU would need to be enacted before member states ratify the ESM treaty.

=== Irish Supreme Court ===
After the unfavorable decision at the High Court, Pringle appealed to the Irish Supreme Court. This Court sent a preliminary reference to the ECJ for clarifications on EU law. It first asked if Council Decision 2011/199/EU, invoking the simplified revision procedure to amend the TFEU, is consistent with EU law. The Court also inquired if member states using the euro were permitted, under the EU treaties, to join another international organization, like the ESM, separate from the EU institutions.

The Supreme Court asked the ECJ for an accelerated procedure as this case possessed "exceptional urgency" because "the stability of the euro area would be seriously damaged by delayed ratification" of the ESM treaty.

=== European Court of Justice ===
The Court of Justice of the European Union (CJEU) held that the European Stability Mechanism was lawful.

The CJEU sat in full court, a rare occurrence when all judges preside. The Court found Council Decision 2011/199/EU to be lawful as the decision's proposed "amendment creates no legal basis for the EU to be able to undertake any action which was not previously possible." The decision finds that "the ESM is not concerned with the coordination of the economic policies of the Member States, but rather constitutes a financing mechanism." Therefore, the ESM does not invade the EU's competency to regulate monetary policy. The ESM "confirms the existence of a power [economic policy] possessed by the Member States," where the "Union does not have exclusive competence." Thus, the ECJ concludes by stating, "Decision 2011/199 does not increase the competences conferred on the Union in the Treaties."

The ESM safeguards the stability of the shared currency by granting financial assistance to states that are in financial hazard and use the euro. This financial assistance is an economic policy instrument and does not impede the EU's ability to control price stability using monetary policy. Therefore, the ESM's actions do not infringe upon the EU's exclusive right to control monetary policy.

The Court also found that "even though the ESM makes use of the EU's institutions," the ESM does not preclude the lawfulness of the decision as it simply established a stability mechanism that "is silent on any possible role for the EU's institutions." Thus, the treaty does not infringe on the rights of the existing EU institutions.

== Significance ==
In this decision, the ECJ rendered the ESM consistent with EU law. Some European legal scholars believe a sense of urgency that the ESM's failure would extenuate the eurozone's financial crisis influenced this decision. While some scholars believe that the political situation influenced the Court's decision, others argue that this decision was essential to prevent the EU from a more significant crisis, thus ensuring the future stability of the EU's legal framework.
