= European Economic Community =

Regional organisation from 1958 to 1993

European Economic Community/European Community
- - Danish: Europæiske Økonomiske Fællesskab
  - Dutch: Europese Economische Gemeenschap
  - French: Communauté économique européenne
  - German: Europäische Wirtschaftsgemeinschaft
  - Greek: Ευρωπαϊκή Οικονομική Κοινότητα
  - Italian: Comunità Economica Europea
  - Portuguese: Comunidade Económica Europeia
  - Spanish: Comunidad Económica Europea
- 1958–1993
- Flag (1986)
- Anthem: "Ode to Joy" (orchestral)
- EEC in 1993
- Status: Economic union
- Institutional seats: Brussels; Luxembourg; Strasbourg²
- Largest city: London
- Official languages: 9 (1993): Danish; Dutch; English; French; German; Greek; Italian; Portuguese; Spanish
- Commission President
  - 1958–1967: Walter Hallstein
  - 1967–1970: Jean Rey
  - 1970–1972: Franco Maria Malfatti
  - 1972–1973: Sicco Mansholt
  - 1973–1977: François-Xavier Ortoli
  - 1977–1981: Roy Jenkins
  - 1981–1985: Gaston Thorn
  - 1985–1993: Jacques Delors
- Legislature: Council of Ministers; European Parliament
- Historical era: Cold War
  - Treaty signed: 25 March 1957
  - Established: 1 January 1958
  - European Communities: 1 July 1967
  - Single market: 1 January 1993
  - EEC becomes the European Community, one of the 3 European Communities constituting the I pillar of the EU: 1 November 1993
  - Pillar abolished: 1 December 2009
- Currency: 13 currencies: EUA/ECU (accounting); Belgian franc; Danish krone; French franc; German mark; Greek drachma; Irish pound; Italian lira; Luxembourgish franc; Dutch guilder; Portuguese escudo; Spanish peseta; Pound sterling
| Succeeded by |
| European Union |
- Today part of: European Union; Greenland; United Kingdom
- ¹ The information in this infobox covers the EEC's time as an independent organisation. It does not give details of post-1993 operation within the EU as that is explained in greater length in the European Union and European Communities articles. ² De facto only, these cities hosted the main institutions but were not titled as capitals.

The European Economic Community (EEC) was a regional organisation created by the Treaty of Rome of 1957, (Note: Today the largely rewritten treaty continues in force as the Treaty on the functioning of the European Union, as renamed by the Lisbon Treaty.) aiming to foster economic integration among its member states. It was subsequently renamed the European Community (EC) upon becoming integrated into the first pillar of the newly formed European Union (EU) in 1993. In the popular language, the singular European Community was sometimes inaccurately used in the wider sense of the plural European Communities, in spite of the latter designation covering all the three constituent entities of the first pillar. The EEC was also known as the European Common Market (ECM) in the English-speaking countries, and sometimes referred to as the European Community even before it was officially renamed as such in 1993. In 2009, the EC formally ceased to exist and its institutions were directly absorbed by the EU. This made the Union the formal successor institution of the Community.

The Community's initial aim was to bring about economic integration, including a common market and customs union, among its six founding members: Belgium, France, Italy, Luxembourg, the Netherlands and West Germany. It gained a common set of institutions along with the European Coal and Steel Community (ECSC) and the European Atomic Energy Community (EURATOM) as one of the European Communities under the 1965 Merger Treaty (Treaty of Brussels). In 1993, a complete single market was achieved, known as the internal market, which allowed for the free movement of goods, capital, services, and people within the EEC. In 1994 the internal market was formalised by the EEA agreement. This agreement also extended the internal market to include most of the member states of the European Free Trade Association, forming the European Economic Area, which encompasses 15 countries.

Upon the entry into force of the Maastricht Treaty in 1993, the EEC was renamed the European Community to reflect that it covered a wider range than economic policy. This was also when the three European Communities, including the EC, were collectively made to constitute the first of the three pillars of the European Union, which the treaty also founded. The EC existed in this form until it was abolished by the 2009 Treaty of Lisbon, which incorporated the EC's institutions into the EU's wider framework and provided that the EU would "replace and succeed the European Community".

== History ==
=== Background ===
In April 1951, the Treaty of Paris was signed, creating the European Coal and Steel Community (ECSC). This was an international community based on supranationalism and international law, designed to help the economy of Europe and prevent future war by integrating its members.

With the aim of creating a federal Europe two further communities were proposed: a European Defence Community and a European Political Community. While the treaty for the latter was being drawn up by the Common Assembly, the ECSC parliamentary chamber, the proposed defence community was rejected by the French Parliament. ECSC President Jean Monnet, a leading figure behind the communities, resigned from the High Authority in protest and began work on alternative communities, based on economic integration rather than political integration. Following the Messina Conference in 1955, Paul-Henri Spaak was given the task to prepare a report on the idea of a customs union. The so-called Spaak Report of the Spaak Committee formed the cornerstone of the intergovernmental negotiations at Val Duchesse conference centre in 1956. Together with the Ohlin Report the Spaak Report would provide the basis for the Treaty of Rome.

In 1956, Paul-Henri Spaak led the Intergovernmental Conference on the Common Market and Euratom at the Val Duchesse conference centre, which prepared for the Treaty of Rome in 1957. The conference led to the signature, on 25 March 1957, of the Treaty of Rome establishing a European Economic Community.

=== Creation and early years ===
The resulting communities were the European Economic Community (EEC) and the European Atomic Energy Community (EURATOM or sometimes EAEC). These were markedly less supranational than the previous communities, due to protests from some countries that their sovereignty was being infringed (however there would still be concerns with the behaviour of the Hallstein Commission). Germany became a founding member of the EEC, and Konrad Adenauer was made leader in a very short time. The first formal meeting of the Hallstein Commission was held on 16 January 1958 at the Château de Val-Duchesse. The EEC (direct ancestor of the modern Community) was to create a customs union while Euratom would promote co-operation in the nuclear power sphere. The EEC rapidly became the most important of these and expanded its activities. The first move towards political developments came at the end of 1959 when the foreign ministers of the six members announced that would be meeting quarterly to discuss political issues and international problems. One of the first important accomplishments of the EEC was the establishment (1962) of common price levels for agricultural products. In 1968, internal tariffs (tariffs on trade between member nations) were removed on certain products.

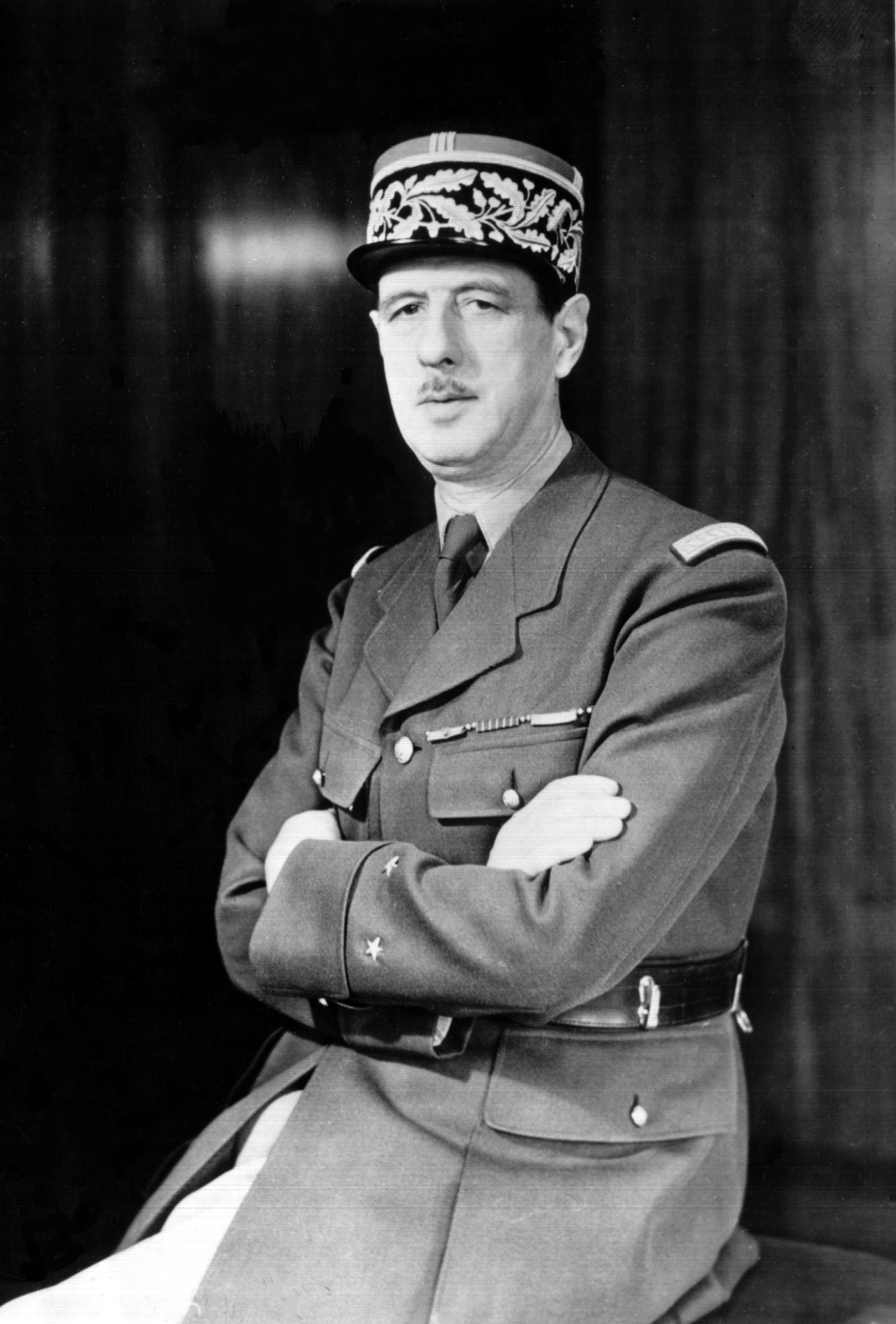
French President Charles de Gaulle vetoed British membership, held back the development of Parliament's powers and was at the centre of the 'empty chair crisis' of 1965.

Another crisis was triggered in regard to proposals for the financing of the Common Agricultural Policy, which came into force in 1962. The transitional period whereby decisions were made by unanimity had come to an end, and majority-voting in the council had taken effect. Then-French President Charles de Gaulle's opposition to supranationalism and fear of the other members challenging the CAP led to an "empty chair policy" whereby French representatives were withdrawn from the European institutions until the French veto was reinstated. Eventually, a compromise was reached with the Luxembourg compromise on 29 January 1966 whereby a gentlemen's agreement permitted members to use a veto on areas of national interest.

On 1 July 1967, when the Merger Treaty came into operation, combining the institutions of the ECSC and Euratom into that of the EEC, they already shared a Parliamentary Assembly and Courts. Collectively they were known as the European Communities. The Communities still had independent personalities although were increasingly integrated. Future treaties granted the community new powers beyond simple economic matters which had achieved a high level of integration. As it got closer to the goal of political integration and a peaceful and united Europe, what Mikhail Gorbachev described as a Common European Home.

=== Enlargement and elections ===
The 1960s saw the first attempts at enlargement. In 1961, Denmark, Ireland, the United Kingdom and Norway (in 1962), applied to join the three Communities. However, President Charles de Gaulle saw British membership as a Trojan Horse for U.S. influence and vetoed membership, and the applications of all four countries were suspended. Greece became the first country to join the EC in 1961 as an associate member, however its membership was suspended in 1967 after a coup d'état established a military dictatorship called the Regime of the Colonels.

A year later, in February 1962, Spain attempted to join the European Community. However, because Francoist Spain was not a democracy, all members rejected the request in 1964.

The four countries resubmitted their applications on 11 May 1967 and with Georges Pompidou succeeding Charles de Gaulle as French president in 1969, the veto was lifted. Negotiations began in 1970 under the pro-European UK government of Edward Heath, who had to deal with disagreements relating to the Common Agricultural Policy and the UK's relationship with the Commonwealth of Nations. Nevertheless, two years later the accession treaties were signed so that Denmark, Ireland and the UK joined the Community effective 1 January 1973. The Norwegian people had rejected membership in a referendum on 25 September 1972.

The Treaties of Rome had stated that the European Parliament must be directly elected; however, this required the Council to agree on a common voting system first. The Council procrastinated on the issue and the Parliament remained appointed, French President Charles de Gaulle was particularly active in blocking the development of the Parliament, with it only being granted Budgetary powers following his resignation.

Parliament pressured for agreement and on 20 September 1976 the Council agreed part of the necessary instruments for election, deferring details on electoral systems which remain varied to this day. During the tenure of President Jenkins, in June 1979, the elections were held in all the then-members (see 1979 European Parliament election). The new Parliament, galvanised by direct election and new powers, started working full-time and became more active than the previous assemblies.

Shortly after its election, the Parliament proposed that the Community adopt the flag of Europe design used by the Council of Europe. The European Council in 1984 appointed an ad hoc committee for this purpose. The European Council in 1985 largely followed the committee's recommendations; but, as the adoption of a flag was strongly reminiscent of a national flag representing statehood was controversial, the "flag of Europe" design was adopted with the status only of a "logo" or "emblem".

The European Council, or European summit, had developed since the 1960s as an informal meeting of the Council at the level of heads of state. It had originated from then-French President Charles de Gaulle's resentment at the domination of supranational institutions (e.g. the commission) over the integration process. It was mentioned in the treaties for the first time in the Single European Act (see below).

Enlargement, 1957 to 2013 Community enlargement Since 1995

=== Toward Maastricht ===
Greece re-applied to join the community on 12 June 1975, following the restoration of democracy, and joined on 1 January 1981. Following on from Greece, and after their own democratic restoration, Spain and Portugal applied to the communities in 1977 and joined on 1 January 1986. In 1987, Turkey formally applied to join the Community and began the longest application process for any country.

With the prospect of further enlargement, and a desire to increase areas of co-operation, the Single European Act was signed by the foreign ministers on 17 and 28 February 1986 in Luxembourg and The Hague respectively. In a single document it dealt with reform of institutions, extension of powers, foreign policy cooperation and the single market. It came into force on 1 July 1987. The act was followed by work on what would be the Maastricht Treaty, which was agreed on 10 December 1991, signed the following year and coming into force on 1 November 1993 establishing the European Union, and paving the way for the European Monetary Union.

=== European Community ===
The EU absorbed the European Communities as one of its three pillars. The EEC's areas of activities were enlarged and were renamed the European Community, continuing to follow the supranational structure of the EEC. The EEC institutions became those of the EU, however the Court, Parliament and Commission had only limited input in the new pillars, as they worked on a more intergovernmental system than the European Communities. This was reflected in the names of the institutions, the council was formally the "Council of the European Union" while the commission was formally the "Commission of the European Communities".

There are more competencies listed in Article 3 of the European Communities pillar than there are in Article 3 of the Treaty of Rome. This is due to the fact that some competencies were already inherent in the Treaty of Rome, some were referred to in the Treaty of Rome, and some were extended under Article 235 of the Treaty of Rome. Competencies were added to cover trans-European networks, and the work of the Culture Committee and Education Committee that were previously sharing existing competencies. The only entry in Article 3 that represented something new is the competence covering the entry and movement of persons in the internal market.

However, after the Treaty of Maastricht, Parliament gained a more formal role. Maastricht brought in the codecision procedure, which gave it equal legislative power with the Council on Community matters. This replaced the informal parliamentary blocking powers established by the 1979 Isoglucose decision.

It also abolished any existing state like Simple Majority voting in the EEC, replacing it with Qualified Majority Voting, a procedure more commonly used in international organisations.

The Treaty of Amsterdam transferred responsibility for free movement of persons (e.g., visas, illegal immigration, asylum) from the Justice and Home Affairs (JHA) pillar to the European Community (JHA was renamed Police and Judicial Co-operation in Criminal Matters (PJCC) as a result). Both Amsterdam and the Treaty of Nice also extended codecision procedure to nearly all policy areas, giving Parliament equal power to the Council in the Community.

In 2002, the Treaty of Paris which established the ECSC expired, having reached its 50-year limit (as the first treaty, it was the only one with a limit). No attempt was made to renew its mandate; instead, the Treaty of Nice transferred certain of its elements to the Treaty of Rome and hence its work continued as part of the EC area of the European Community's remit.

After the entry into force of the Treaty of Lisbon in 2009 the pillar structure ceased to exist. The European Community, together with its legal personality, was absorbed into the newly consolidated European Union which merged in the other two pillars (however Euratom remained distinct). This was originally proposed under the European Constitution but that treaty failed ratification in 2005.

== Aims and achievements ==
The main aim of the EEC, as stated in its preamble, was to "preserve peace and liberty and to lay the foundations of an ever closer union among the peoples of Europe". Calling for balanced economic growth, this was to be accomplished through:

1. The establishment of a customs union with a common external tariff
2. Common policies for agriculture, transport and trade, including standardization (for example, the CE marking designates standards compliance)
3. Enlargement of the EEC to the rest of Europe

Citing Article 2 from the original text of the Treaty of Rome of 25 March 1957, the EEC aimed at "a harmonious development of economic activities, a continuous and balanced expansion, an increase in stability, an accelerated raising of the standard of living and closer relations between the States belonging to it". Given the fear of the Cold War, many Western Europeans were afraid that poverty would make "the population vulnerable to communist propaganda" (Meurs 2018, p. 68), meaning that increasing prosperity would be beneficial to harmonise power between the Western and Eastern blocs, other than reconcile Member States such as France and Germany after WW2.

The tasks entrusted to the Community were divided among an assembly, the European Parliament, Council, Commission, and Court of Justice. Moreover, restrictions to market were lifted to further liberate trade among Member States. Citizens of Member States (other than goods, services, and capital) were entitled to freedom of movement. The CAP, Common Agricultural Policy, regulated and subsided the agricultural sphere. A European Social Fund was implemented in favour of employees who lost their jobs. A European Investment Bank was established to "facilitate the economic expansion of the Community by opening up fresh resources" (Art. 3 Treaty of Rome 25 March 1957). All these implementations included overseas territories. Competition was to be kept alive to make products cheaper for European consumers.

For the customs union, the treaty provided for a 10% reduction in custom duties and up to 20% of global import quotas. Progress on the customs union proceeded much faster than the twelve years planned. However, France faced some setbacks due to their war with Algeria.

== Members ==
The six states that founded the EEC and the other two Communities were known as the "inner six" (the "outer seven" were those countries who formed the European Free Trade Association). The six were France, West Germany, Italy and the three Benelux countries: Belgium, the Netherlands and Luxembourg. The first enlargement was in 1973, with the accession of Denmark, Ireland and the United Kingdom. Greece, Spain and Portugal joined in the 1980s. The former East Germany became part of the EEC upon German reunification in 1990. Following the creation of the EU in 1993, it has enlarged to include an additional sixteen countries by 2013.

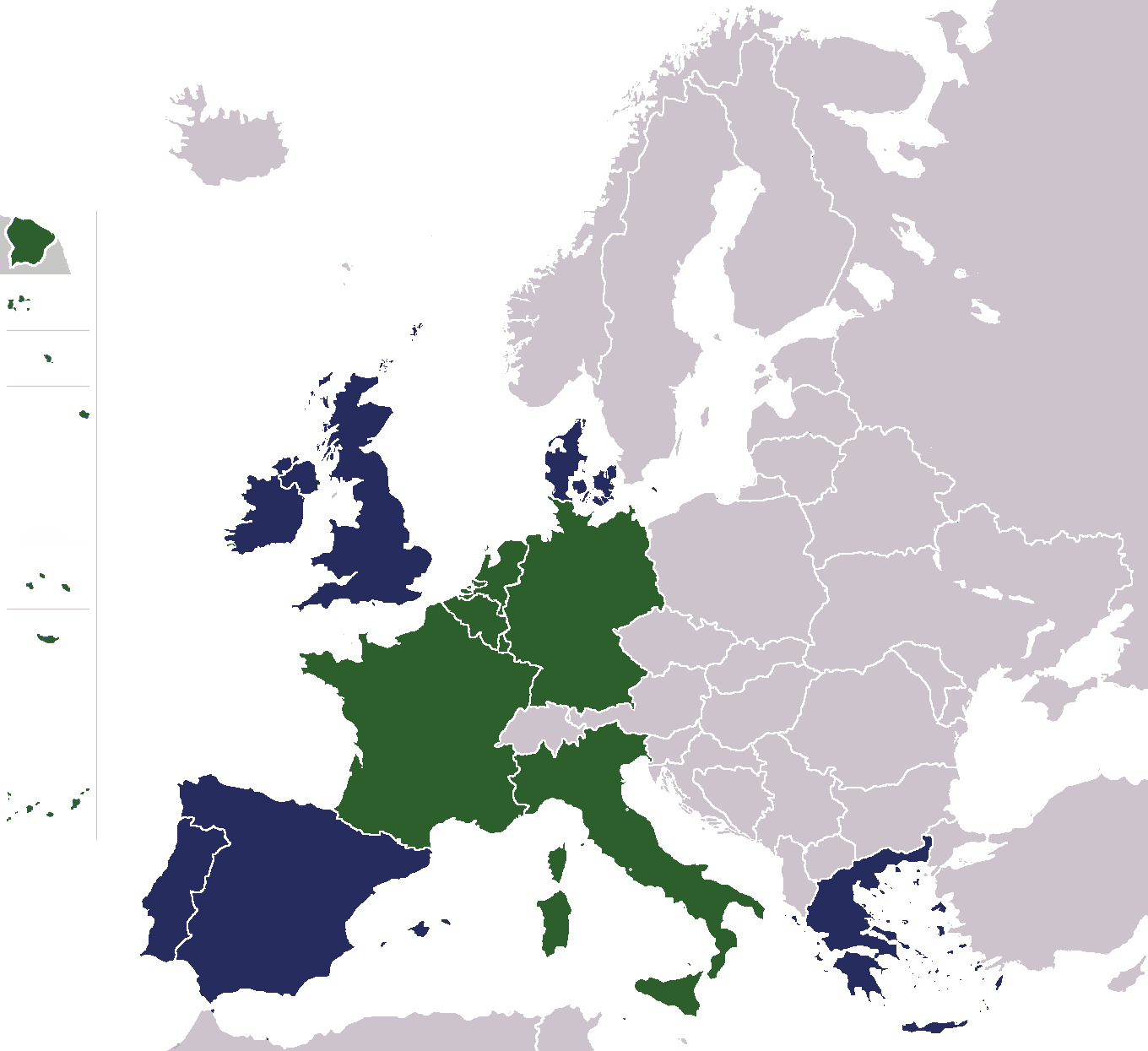
Founding members of EEC Later members of EEC

| Flag | State | Accession | Language(s) | Currency | Population (1990) |
|---|---|---|---|---|---|
| | Belgium | 25 March 1957 | Dutch, French and German | Franc (fr.) (Note: The Belgian and Luxembourgish francs were 1:1 and theoretically interchangeable as a single currency.) | 10,016,000 |
| | France | 25 March 1957 | French | Franc (F) | 56,718,000 |
| | West Germany/Germany (Note: German reunification took place in 1990.) | 25 March 1957 | German | Mark (DM) | 63,254,000 (Note: Including East Germany: 80,274,200) |
| | Italy | 25 March 1957 | Italian | Lira (Lit.) | 56,762,700 |
| | Luxembourg | 25 March 1957 | French, German and Luxembourgish | Franc (fr.) | 384,400 |
| | Netherlands | 25 March 1957 | Dutch and Frisian | Guilder (ƒ) | 14,892,300 |
| | Denmark | 1 January 1973 | Danish | Krone (kr.) | 5,146,500 |
| | Ireland | 1 January 1973 | Irish and English | Punt (£) | 3,521,000 |
| | United Kingdom | 1 January 1973 | English (Note: And recognised regional languages: Cornish, Gaelic, Irish, Scots, and Welsh) | Sterling (£) | 57,681,000 |
| | Greece | 1 January 1981 | Greek | Drachma (₯) | 10,120,000 |
| | Portugal | 1 January 1986 | Portuguese | Escudo | 9,862,500 |
| | Spain | 1 January 1986 | Spanish (Note: And recognised regional languages: Aranese, Basque, Catalan, and Galician) | Peseta (₧) | 38,993,800 |

Member states are represented in some form in each institution. The Council is also composed of one national minister who represents their national government. Each state also has a right to one European Commissioner each, although in the European Commission they are not supposed to represent their national interest but that of the Community. Prior to 2004, the larger members (France, Germany, Italy and the United Kingdom) have had two Commissioners. In the European Parliament, members are allocated a set number seats related to their population, however these (since 1979) have been directly elected and they sit according to political allegiance, not national origin. Most other institutions, including the European Court of Justice, have some form of national division of its members.

== Institutions ==
There were three political institutions which held the executive and legislative power of the EEC, plus one judicial institution and a fifth body created in 1975. These institutions (except for the auditors) were created in 1957 by the EEC but from 1967 onwards they applied to all three Communities. The Council represents the member state governments, the Parliament represents citizens and the Commission represents the European interest. Essentially, the council, Parliament or another party place a request for legislation to the commission. The Commission then drafts this and presents it to the council for approval and the Parliament for an opinion (in some cases it had a veto, depending upon the legislative procedure in use). The commission's duty is to ensure it is implemented by dealing with the day-to-day running of the Union and taking others to Court if they fail to comply. After the Maastricht Treaty in 1993, these institutions became those of the European Union, though limited in some areas due to the pillar structure. Despite this, Parliament in particular has gained more power over legislation and security of the commission. The Court of Justice was the highest authority in the law, settling legal disputes in the Community, while the Auditors had no power but to investigate.

=== Background ===
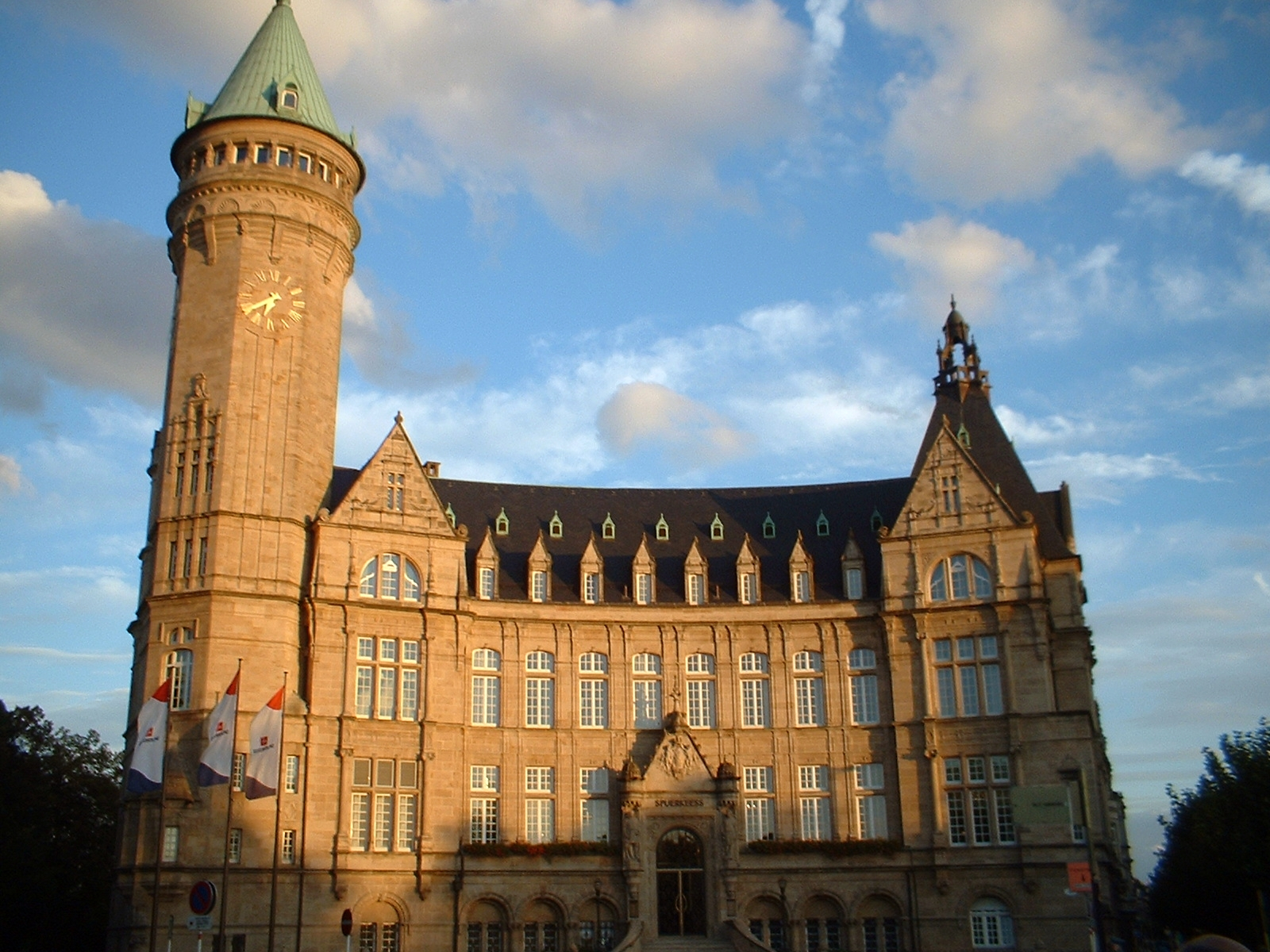
The High Authority had more executive powers than the Commission which replaced it.

The EEC inherited some of the Institutions of the ECSC in that the Common Assembly and Court of Justice of the ECSC had their authority extended to the EEC and Euratom in the same role. However the EEC, and Euratom, had different executive bodies to the ECSC. In place of the ECSC's Council of Ministers was the Council of the European Economic Community, and in place of the High Authority was the Commission of the European Communities.

There was greater difference between these than name: the French government of the day had grown suspicious of the supranational power of the High Authority and sought to curb its powers in favour of the intergovernmental style Council. Hence the council had a greater executive role in the running of the EEC than was the situation in the ECSC. By virtue of the Merger Treaty in 1967, the executives of the ECSC and Euratom were merged with that of the EEC, creating a single institutional structure governing the three separate Communities. From here on, the term European Communities were used for the institutions (for example, from Commission of the European Economic Community to the Commission of the European Communities).

=== Council ===
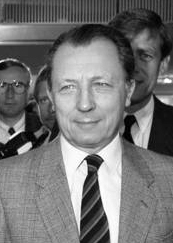
President Jacques Delors, the last EEC Commission President

The Council of the European Communities was a body holding legislative and executive powers and was thus the main decision-making body of the Community. Its Presidency rotated between the member states every six months and it is related to the European Council, which was an informal gathering of national leaders (started in 1961) on the same basis as the council.

The council was composed of one national minister from each member state. However the Council met in various forms depending upon the topic. For example, if agriculture was being discussed, the council would be composed of each national minister for agriculture. They represented their governments and were accountable to their national political systems. Votes were taken either by majority (with votes allocated according to population) or unanimity. In these various forms they share some legislative and budgetary power of the Parliament. Since the 1960s the council also began to meet informally at the level of heads of government and heads of state; these European summits followed the same presidency system and secretariat as the council but was not a formal formation of it.

=== Commission ===
The Commission of the European Communities was the executive arm of the community, drafting Community law, dealing with the day to running of the Community and upholding the treaties. It was designed to be independent, representing the interest of the Community as a whole. Every member state submitted one commissioner (two from each of the larger states, one from the smaller states). One of its members was the President, appointed by the council, who chaired the body and represented it.

=== Parliament ===
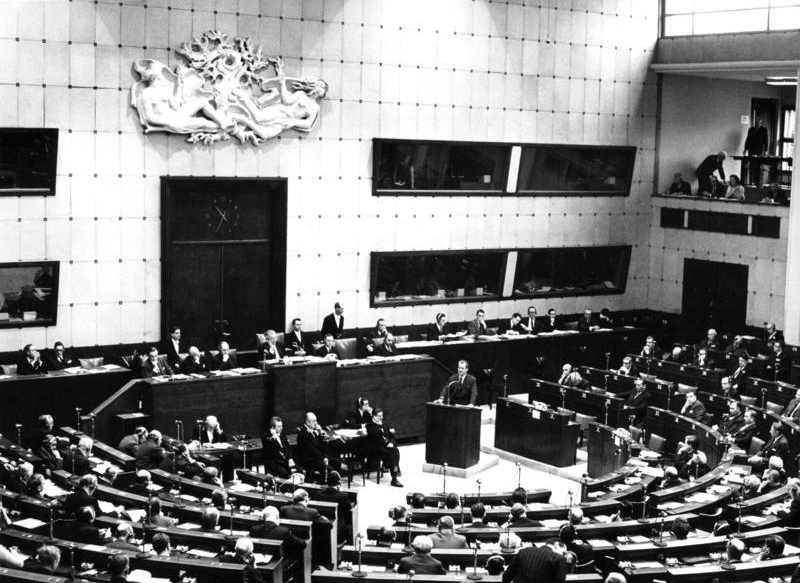
The European Parliament held its first elections in 1979, slowly gaining more influence over Community decision making.

Under the Community, the European Parliament (formerly the European Parliamentary Assembly) had an advisory role to the Council and Commission. There were a number of Community legislative procedures, at first there was only the consultation procedure, which meant Parliament had to be consulted, although it was often ignored. The Single European Act gave Parliament more power, with the assent procedure giving it a right to veto proposals and the cooperation procedure giving it equal power with the Council if the council was not unanimous.

In 1970 and 1975, the Budgetary treaties gave Parliament power over the Community budget. The Parliament's members, up-until 1980 were national MPs serving part-time in the Parliament. The Treaties of Rome had required elections to be held once the council had decided on a voting system, but this did not happen and elections were delayed until 1979 (see 1979 European Parliament election). After that, Parliament was elected every five years. In the following 20 years, it gradually won co-decision powers with the Council over the adoption of legislation, the right to approve or reject the appointment of the Commission President and the commission as a whole, and the right to approve or reject international agreements entered into by the Community.

=== Court ===
The Court of Justice of the European Communities was the highest court of on matters of Community law and was composed of one judge per state with a president elected from among them. Its role was to ensure that Community law was applied in the same way across all states and to settle legal disputes between institutions or states. It became a powerful institution as Community law overrides national law.

=== Auditors ===
The fifth institution is the European Court of Auditors. Its ensured that taxpayer funds from the Community budget had been correctly spent by the Community's institutions. The ECA provided an audit report for each financial year to the Council and Parliament and gave opinions and proposals on financial legislation and anti-fraud actions. It is the only institution not mentioned in the original treaties, having been set up in 1975.

== Policy areas ==
At the time of its abolition, the European Community pillar covered the following areas:

- Asylum policy
- Border control
- Common Agricultural Policy
- Common Fisheries Policy
- Competition
- Consumer protection
- Customs union and Single market
- Economic and monetary union
- Education and Culture
- Employment
- Environmental law
- EU Citizenship
- Healthcare
- Immigration policy
- Research
- Schengen treaty
- Social policy
- Trade policy
- Trans-European Networks

== See also ==
- Economy of the European Union
- Brussels and the European Union
- Delors Commission
- European Commission
- European Customs Information Portal
- European institutions in Strasbourg
- History of the European Communities (1958–1972)
- History of the European Communities (1973–1993)
- Institutional seats of the European Union
- Snake in the tunnel

== EU evolution timeline ==
Since the end of World War II, most sovereign European countries have entered into treaties and thereby co-operated and harmonised policies (or pooled sovereignty) in an increasing number of areas, in the European integration project or the construction of Europe (French: la construction européenne). The following timeline outlines the legal inception of the European Union (EU)—the principal framework for this unification. The EU inherited many of its present organisations, institutions, and responsibilities from the European Communities (EC), which were founded in the 1950s in the spirit of the Schuman Declaration.

Legend:
S: signing
F: entry into force
T: termination
E: expiry
de facto supersession
Rel. w/ EC/EU framework:
de facto inside
outside

European Union (EU)
[Cont.]
European Communities (EC)
(Pillar I)

European Atomic Energy Community (EAEC or EURATOM)

[Cont.]

/ / / European Coal and Steel Community (ECSC)

(Distr. of competences)

European Economic Community (EEC)

Schengen Rules
European Community (EC)
TREVI
Justice and Home Affairs (JHA, pillar III)

/ North Atlantic Treaty Organisation (NATO)
[Cont.]
Police and Judicial Co-operation in Criminal Matters (PJCC, pillar III)

Anglo-French alliance
[Defence arm handed to NATO]
European Political Co-operation (EPC)

Common Foreign and Security Policy
(CFSP, pillar II)
Western Union (WU)
/ Western European Union (WEU)
[Tasks defined following the WEU's 1984 reactivation handed to the EU]

[Social, cultural tasks handed to CoE]
[Cont.]

Council of Europe (CoE)
Entente Cordiale
S: 8 April 1904
Dunkirk Treaty (Note: Although not EU treaties per se, these treaties affected the development of the EU defence arm, a main part of the CFSP. The Franco-British alliance established by the Dunkirk Treaty was de facto superseded by WU. The CFSP pillar was bolstered by some of the security structures that had been established within the remit of the 1955 Modified Brussels Treaty (MBT). The Brussels Treaty was terminated in 2011, consequently dissolving the WEU, as the mutual defence clause that the Lisbon Treaty provided for EU was considered to render the WEU superfluous. The EU thus de facto superseded the WEU.)
S: 4 March 1947
F: 8 September 1947
E: 8 September 1997
Brussels Treaty
S: 17 March 1948
F: 25 August 1948
T: 30 June 2011
London and Washington treaties
S: 5 May/4 April 1949
F: 3 August/24 August 1949
Paris treaties: ECSC and EDC (Note: Plans to establish a European Political Community (EPC) were shelved following the French failure to ratify the Treaty establishing the European Defence Community (EDC). The EPC would have combined the ECSC and the EDC.)
S: 18 April 1951/27 May 1952
F: 23 July 1952/?
E: 23 July 2002/—
Protocol Modifying and
Completing the Brussels Treaty
S: 23 October 1954
F: 6 May 1955
Rome treaties: EEC and EAEC
S: 25 March 1957
F: 1 January 1958
WEU-CoE agreement
S: 21 October 1959
F: 1 January 1960
Brussels (Merger) Treaty (Note: The European Communities obtained common institutions and a shared legal personality (i.e. ability to e.g. sign treaties in their own right).)
S: 8 April 1965
F: 1 July 1967
Davignon report
S: 27 October 1970
European Council conclusions
S: 2 December 1975
Single European Act (SEA)
S: 17/28 February 1986
F: 1 July 1987
Schengen Agreement and Convention
S: 14 June 1985/19 June 1990
F: 26 March 1995
Maastricht Treaty (Note: The treaties of Maastricht and Rome form the EU's legal basis, and are also referred to as the Treaty on European Union (TEU) and the Treaty on the Functioning of the European Union (TFEU), respectively. They are amended by secondary treaties.) (Note: Between the EU's founding in 1993 and consolidation in 2009, the union consisted of three pillars, the first of which were the European Communities. The other two pillars consisted of additional areas of cooperation that had been added to the EU's remit.)
S: 7 February 1992
F: 1 November 1993
Amsterdam Treaty
S: 2 October 1997
F: 1 May 1999
Nice Treaty
S: 26 February 2001
F: 1 February 2003
Lisbon Treaty (Note: The consolidation meant that the EU inherited the European Communities' legal personality and that the pillar system was abolished, resulting in the EU framework as such covering all policy areas. Executive/legislative power in each area was instead determined by a distribution of competencies between EU institutions and member states. This distribution, as well as treaty provisions for policy areas in which unanimity is required and qualified majority voting is possible, reflects the depth of EU integration as well as the EU's partly supranational and partly intergovernmental nature.)
S: 13 December 2007
F: 1 December 2009
