= Convention on the Transfer of Sentenced Persons =

International extradition treaty

The Convention on the Transfer of Sentenced Persons is an international treaty regulating the extradition and social rehabilitation of imprisoned persons. The Convention was concluded in Strasbourg on 21 March 1983 and entered into force on 1 July 1985. It has been ratified by 69 countries, including every country of the Council of Europe except Monaco. It has also been ratified by 21 states outside the Council of Europe, including Australia, Canada, India, Israel, Japan, South Korea, Mexico, the United States and Brazil. The latest accession to the Convention was Brazil in June 2023.

The Convention is intended to facilitate social rehabilitation of prisoners by providing foreigners convicted of a criminal offence the possibility of serving their sentences in their home countries. Humanitarian considerations also played a role in the drafting of the Convention, since factors such as language barriers resulting in difficulties with communication and distance from family and friends can constitute an impediment to social rehabilitation.

== Terms ==
According to Convention, the extradition (transfer) may be requested by either the state in which the sentence was imposed (the "sentencing State") or the state of which the sentenced person is a national (the "administering State"). The transfer is subject to the consent of the two States involved, and the consent of the sentenced person.

Article 1 sets out definitions for the purposes of the Convention. It defines a sentence as "any punishment or measure involving deprivation of liberty ordered by a court for a limited or unlimited period of time on account of a criminal offence".

The general principles of the Convention are outlined in Article 2, which states that Parties undertake to afford each other the widest measure of cooperation in compliance with this Convention. Article 2 also states the aim of the Convention: that a person sentenced in the territory of a Party may be transferred to the territory of another to serve the sentence imposed on him.

Article 3 sets out the conditions for the transfer, such as the condition that a sentenced person may only be transferred if that person is a national of the administering state, and if the judgment is final. It also states that any State may, at any time, by a declaration addressed to the Secretary-General of the Council of Europe, define, as far as it is concerned, the term “national” for the purposes of this Convention. Importantly, the transfer must be consented to by the sentenced person, and the sentencing State must ensure that this consent is given voluntarily and with full knowledge of its legal consequences, in accordance with Article 7.

Article 12 provides each party to the Convention the possibility to grant pardon or commutation of the sentence in accordance with its constitution or domestic laws.

== Competing legislation ==
For European Union nationals sentenced in another EU country, the similarly worded Council Framework Decision 2008/909/JHA applies instead of this Convention.

== See also ==
- List of Council of Europe treaties
