= Budgetary treaties of the European Communities =

Budgetary Treaty of 1970
Treaty amending Certain Budgetary Provisions of the Treaties establishing the European Communities and of the Treaty establishing a Single Council and a Single Commission of the European Communities
- Signed: 22 April 1970
- Location: Luxembourg City, Luxembourg
- Effective: 1 January 1971
- Signatories: The Six

Budgetary Treaty of 1975
Treaty amending Certain Financial Provisions of the Treaty establishing the European Communities and of the Treaty establishing a Single Council and a Single Commission of the European Communities
- Signed: 22 July 1975
- Location: Brussels, Belgium
- Effective: 1 June 1977
- Signatories: All then-9 EC members

The Budgetary treaties of the European Communities were two treaties in the 1970s amending the Treaty of Rome in respects to powers over the Community budget.

The first treaty, signed in 1970, gave the European Parliament the last word on what is known as "non-compulsory expenditure" (compulsory spending is that resulting from EC treaties or from legislation adopted pursuant to the treaties (including agriculture) and international agreements; the rest is non-compulsory). The second treaty, signed in 1975, gave Parliament the power to reject the budget as a whole and created the European Court of Auditors. However, the Council continued to have the last word on compulsory spending (in that it could over-rule Parliament's amendments by a qualified majority) while Parliament continued to have the last word (within a maximum rate of increase) on non-compulsory spending.

As a result of these treaties, the budgetary authority of what is now the European Union is held jointly by the Council of the European Union and the European Parliament. However, the detailed procedures were later changed by the Lisbon Treaty which provided that Parliament and Council must jointly agree on all items of expenditure, abolishing the distinction between compulsory and non-compulsory expenditure.

Parliament is also responsible for giving discharge to the European Commission on the implementation of previous year's budget, on the basis of the annual report of the European Court of Auditors. It has refused to give discharge twice, in 1984 and in 1998. On the latter occasion this led to the resignation of the Santer Commission.

== See also ==
- European Parliament#Budget
