= Treaty establishing the European Stability Mechanism =

2012 Eurozone Treaty

ESM Treaty
Treaty Establishing the European Stability Mechanism
- ESM member states Other EU member states
- Type: Intergovernmental agreement
- Signed: 2 February 2012
- Location: Brussels
- Effective: 27 September 2012
- Condition: Ratification by signatories whose initial subscriptions represent no less than 90% of the total
- Parties: All Member States of the eurozone (21)
- Depositary: General Secretariat of the Council of the European Union
- Languages: Bulgarian, Croatian, Dutch, English, Estonian, Finnish, French, German, Greek, Irish, Italian, Latvian, Lithuanian, Maltese, Portuguese, Slovak, Slovenian, Spanish and Swedish

Full text
- Treaty Establishing the European Stability Mechanism (2012) at Wikisource

The Treaty Establishing the European Stability Mechanism was signed by the member states of the eurozone to found the European Stability Mechanism (ESM), an international organisation located in Luxembourg, to act as a permanent source of financial assistance for member states in financial difficulty, with a maximum lending capacity of €500 billion. It replaced two earlier temporary EU funding programmes: the European Financial Stability Facility (EFSF) and the European Financial Stabilisation Mechanism (EFSM). All new bailouts of eurozone member states will be covered by ESM, while the EFSF and EFSM will continue to handle money transfers and program monitoring for bailouts previously approved for Ireland, Portugal and Greece.

The treaty stipulated that the organization would be established if member states representing 90% of its original capital requirements ratified the founding treaty. This threshold was surpassed with Germany's ratification on 27 September 2012, bringing the treaty into force on that date for the sixteen states which had ratified the agreement. The ESM commenced its operations at a meeting on 8 October 2012. A separate treaty, amending Article 136 of the Treaty on the Functioning of the European Union (TFEU) to authorize the establishment of the ESM under EU law, was planned to enter into force on 1 January 2013. However, the last of the 27 European Union member states to ratify the amendment, the Czech Republic, did not do so until 23 April 2013, resulting in its entry into force on 1 May 2013. In June 2015, an updated EMU reform plan was released which envisaged that in the medium-term (between July 2017 and 2025) the ESM should be transposed from being an intergovernmental agreement to become fully integrated into the EU law framework applying to all eurozone member states, so that the ESM can be governed more smoothly by the EU institutions - under the competence provided for by the amended article 136 of the TFEU.

== History ==
During the Euro area crisis, there was a drive to reform the functioning of the eurozone in the event of a crisis. This led to the creation, amongst other things, of loan (pejoratively called "bailout" in the media) mechanisms: the European Financial Stability Facility (EFSF) for eurozone member states and the European Financial Stability Mechanism (EFSM) for all EU member states. These, together with the International Monetary Fund, would lend money to EU states in trouble, in the same way that the European Central Bank can lend money to European banks. However, the EFSF was only intended to be a temporary measure, in part due to the lack of a legal basis in the EU treaties.

In particular, EFSM funding was granted under Article 122 of the TFEU, which stipulates that only states facing "severe difficulties caused by natural disasters or exceptional occurrences beyond its control" were eligible. Since the recipient governments had played a role in causing their financial distress, it was unclear whether this clause was met. As well, there was an argument that the EFSF, which was established as an intergovernmental organization outside the framework of EU law, was incompatible with the "no bailout" provisions of Article 125.

== Treaty basis ==
In order to resolve these issue, the German government felt a treaty amendment was necessary. After the difficulties ratifying the Treaty of Lisbon, many states opposed reopening the treaties and the British government opposed changes affecting the United Kingdom. However, after winning the support of French President Nicolas Sarkozy, the European Council agreed to draft a new treaty in October 2010 that would be a minimal amendment to give the proposed permanent lending mechanism, which would subsequently be negotiated as an intergovernmental treaty outside of the EU framework, legitimacy under EU law. The two line amendment to Article 136 of the Treaty on the Functioning of the European Union (TFEU), which was approved by the European Council on 16 December 2010, reads:

The member states whose currency is the euro may establish a stability mechanism to be activated if indispensable to safeguard the stability of the euro area as a whole. The granting of any required financial assistance under the mechanism will be made subject to strict conditionality.

Due to the intergovernmental nature of the permanent lending mechanism, which was named the European Stability Mechanism (ESM), the simplified treaty revision procedure could be used for the TFEU amendment as the EU's powers were not being increased. However, the amendment would not fulfill the German demand that the removal of voting rights be a possible sanction, as that would require a deeper treaty amendment. The revision of the treaty was designed so there would be no need for referendums, allowing for a speedy ratification process, with the aim to have it come into force in July 2012.

In March 2011, the European Parliament approved the treaty amendment after receiving assurances that the European Commission, rather than EU states, would play 'a central role' in running the ESM, despite wishing it had been more involved earlier, and it was signed by all 27 EU member states on 25 March 2011.

A separate treaty among eurozone states, named the Treaty Establishing the European Stability Mechanism, was also agreed to establish the ESM and set out the details of how it would operate. Formally, two treaties with this name were signed: one on 11 July 2011 and one on 2 February 2012. After the first turned out to be not substantial enough, the second version was produced to "make it more effective". The ESM was designed to be fully compatible with existing EU law, and the European Court of Justice ruled that "the right of a Member State to conclude and ratify the ESM Treaty is not subject to the entry into force" of the TFEU amendment. The 2012 version was signed by all 17 eurozone members on 2 February 2012, and was planned to enter into force by mid-2012, when the EFSF and EFSM were set to expire. The treaty was concluded exclusively by eurozone states, in part because the UK refused to participate in any fiscal integration.

Another amendment to the ESM Treaty was signed on 27 January 2021. As of February 2024 it had been ratified by all ESM member states except Italy, whose parliament rejected ratification in December 2023 and imposed a moratorium on reconsidering the decision for 6 months, preventing the amendment's entry into force.

== Membership ==
The treaty stipulated that it would enter into force once member states representing 90% of its original capital requirements ratified the founding treaty according to their respective constitutional requirements. This threshold was surpassed with Germany's ratification on 27 September 2012, bringing the treaty into force on that date for the 16 states which had ratified the agreement by that point on 27 September 2012. Estonia, the only remaining eurozone state at that date, which had committed only 0.19% of the capital, completed its ratification on 3 October 2012. The ESM commenced its operations at a meeting on 8 October 2012. The TFEU amendment came into force on 1 May 2013, after the Czech Republic became the last member state to ratify the agreement.

According to the text of the treaty, the ESM is open to accession by any EU member state once their derogation from using the euro has been lifted by the Council of the European Union. New members must be approved by the ESM's Board of Governors, after which they would need to ratify the Treaty Establishing the ESM. After Latvia's adoption of the euro on 1 January 2014 was given final approval by the Economic and Financial Affairs Council on 9 July, the ESM Board of Governors approved its membership application in October 2013. It became the first state to accede to the ESM on 21 February 2014, joining on 13 March 2014. Lithuania adopted the euro on 1 January 2015, and acceded to the ESM on 14 January 2015, becoming a member on 3 February 2015. Croatia adopted the euro on 1 January 2023, acceded to the ESM on 2 March 2023 and became a member on 22 March 2023 when the Treaty entered into force for it. Bulgaria adopted the euro on 1 January 2026, acceded to the ESM on 9 June 2026 and became a member on 29 June 2026.

== Ratification ==
=== Treaty establishing the ESM ===
State	Percent of ESM contributions	Signed	Conclusion date	Institution	Majority needed	In favour	Against	AB	Deposited	Ref.
Austria	2.72%	Yes	4 Jul 2012	National Council	50%	126	53	0	30 Jul 2012	
Austria	2.72%	Yes	6 Jul 2012	Federal Council	50%	45	10	0	30 Jul 2012	
Austria	2.72%	Yes	17 Jul 2012	Presidential Assent	-	Granted			30 Jul 2012	
Belgium	3.40%	Yes	7 Jun 2012	Senate	50%	46	4	14	26 Jun 2012	
Belgium	3.40%	Yes	14 Jun 2012	Chamber of Representatives	50%	90	14	24	26 Jun 2012	
Belgium	3.40%	Yes	20 Jun 2012	Royal Assent	-	Granted			26 Jun 2012	
Bulgaria	0.74%	No	20 May 2026	National Assembly	50%	189	10	0	9 June 2026	
Bulgaria	0.74%	No	26 May 2026	Presidential Assent	-	Granted			9 June 2026	
Croatia	0.52%	No	8 Feb 2023	Parliament	50%	124	0	5	2 Mar 2023	
Croatia	0.52%	No	10 Feb 2023	Presidential Assent	-	Granted			2 Mar 2023	
Cyprus	0.19%	Yes	31 May 2012	House of Representatives	50%	48	0	0	28 Jun 2012	
Cyprus	0.19%	Yes	15 Jun 2012	Presidential Assent	-	Granted			28 Jun 2012	
Estonia	0.25%	Yes	30 Aug 2012	Riigikogu	50%	59	34	6	3 Oct 2012	
Estonia	0.25%	Yes	11 Sep 2012	Presidential Assent	-	Granted			3 Oct 2012	
Finland	1.76%	Yes	21 Jun 2012	Parliament	50%	104	71	24	29 Jun 2012	
Finland	1.76%	Yes	29 Jun 2012	Presidential Assent	-	Granted			29 Jun 2012	
France	19.91%	Yes	21 Feb 2012	National Assembly	50%	256	44	131	2 Apr 2012	
France	19.91%	Yes	28 Feb 2012	Senate	50%	169	35	138	2 Apr 2012	
France	19.91%	Yes	7 Mar 2012	Presidential Assent	-	Granted			2 Apr 2012	
Germany	26.51%	Yes	29 Jun 2012	Bundestag	66.7%	493	106	5	27 Sep 2012	
Germany	26.51%	Yes	29 Jun 2012	Bundesrat	66.7%	65	0	4	27 Sep 2012	
Germany	26.51%	Yes	13 Sep 2012	Presidential Assent	-	Granted			27 Sep 2012	
Greece	2.75%	Yes	28 Mar 2012	Parliament	50%	194	59	0	10 May 2012	
Ireland	1.55%	Yes	20 Jun 2012	Dáil Éireann	50%	114	22	0	1 Aug 2012	
Ireland	1.55%	Yes	27 Jun 2012	Seanad Éireann	50%	37	3	0	1 Aug 2012	
Ireland	1.55%	Yes	3 Jul 2012	Presidential Assent	-	Granted			1 Aug 2012	
Italy	17.49%	Yes	12 Jul 2012	Senate	50%	191	21	15	14 Sep 2012	
Italy	17.49%	Yes	19 Jul 2012	Chamber of Deputies	50%	380	59	36	14 Sep 2012	
Italy	17.49%	Yes	23 Jul 2012	Presidential Assent	-	Granted			14 Sep 2012	
Latvia	0.40%	No	30 Jan 2014	Parliament	50%	56	0	25	21 Feb 2014	
Latvia	0.40%	No	10 Feb 2014	Presidential Assent	-	Granted			21 Feb 2014	
Lithuania	0.40%	No	18 Dec 2014	Seimas	50%	82	1	1	14 Jan 2015	
Lithuania	0.40%	No	18 Dec 2014	Presidential Assent	-	Granted			14 Jan 2015	
Luxembourg	0.24%	Yes	26 Jun 2012	Chamber of Deputies	66.7%	49	5	0	31 Jul 2012	
Luxembourg	0.24%	Yes	3 Jul 2012	Royal Assent	-	Granted			31 Jul 2012	
Malta	0.09%	Yes	6 Jul 2012	House of Representatives	50%	25	0	0	19 Jul 2012	
Netherlands	5.58%	Yes	24 May 2012	House of Representatives	50%	100	47	0	13 Jul 2012	
Netherlands	5.58%	Yes	3 Jul 2012	Senate	50%	50	23	0	13 Jul 2012	
Netherlands	5.58%	Yes	5 Jul 2012	Royal Assent	-	Granted			13 Jul 2012	
Portugal	2.45%	Yes	13 Apr 2012	Assembly of the Republic	50%	204	24	2	4 Jul 2012	
Portugal	2.45%	Yes	19 Jun 2012	Presidential Assent	-	Granted			4 Jul 2012	
Slovakia	0.97%	Yes	22 Jun 2012	National Council	60% (absolute) min 90 votes	118	20	5	29 Jun 2012	
Slovakia	0.97%	Yes	9 Jul 2012	Presidential Assent	-	Granted			29 Jun 2012	
Slovenia	0.46%	Yes	19 Apr 2012	National Assembly	50%	74	0	1	30 May 2012	
Slovenia	0.46%	Yes	30 Apr 2012	Presidential Assent	-	Granted			30 May 2012	
Spain	11.62%	Yes	17 May 2012	Congress of Deputies	50% (absolute) min 176 votes	292	17	7	2 Jul 2012	
Spain	11.62%	Yes	6 Jun 2012	Senate	50% (absolute) min 134 votes	237	1	0	2 Jul 2012	
Spain	11.62%	Yes	21 Jun 2012	Royal Assent	-	Granted			2 Jul 2012	

= States which acceded to the ESM

=== TFEU Article 136 amendment ===
TFEU Article 136 amendment
Treaty on the Functioning of the European Union Article 136 amendment
- Signed: 25 March 2011
- Location: Brussels
- Effective: 1 May 2013
- Condition: Ratification by all European Union member states
- Parties: All Member States of the European Union (27)
- Depositary: General Secretariat of the Council of the European Union

Full text at Wikisource
- European Council Decision amending Article 136 of the Treaty on the Functioning of the European Union

Signatory	Conclusion date	Institution	Majority needed	In favour	Against	AB	Deposited	Ref.
Austria	6 Jul 2012	Federal Council	66.7%	45	10		30 Jul 2012	
Austria	4 Jul 2012	National Council	66.7%	125	53		30 Jul 2012	
Austria	17 Jul 2012	Presidential Assent	-	Granted			30 Jul 2012	
Belgium	10 May 2012	Senate	50%	54	4	2	16 Jul 2012	
Belgium	14 Jun 2012	Chamber of Representatives	50%	110	14	2	16 Jul 2012	
Belgium	9 Jul 2012	Royal Assent	-	Granted			16 Jul 2012	
Belgium	11 Jan 2012	Walloon Parliament (regional)	50%	70	0	0	16 Jul 2012	
Belgium	19 Mar 2012	German-speaking Community	50%	21	2	1	16 Jul 2012	
Belgium	20 Dec 2011	French Community	50%	82	0	0	16 Jul 2012	
Belgium	2 Mar 2012	Brussels Regional Parliament	50%	73	2	0	16 Jul 2012	
Belgium	30 March 2012	CCC United Assembly	50%	73	2	1	16 Jul 2012	
Belgium	27 Jun 2012	Flemish Parliament (regional) (community matters)	50%	74	17	5	16 Jul 2012	
Belgium	27 Jun 2012	Flemish Parliament (regional) (community matters)	50%	78	17	6	16 Jul 2012	
Bulgaria	13 Jul 2012	National Assembly	50%	84	2	14	6 Aug 2012	
Bulgaria	23 Jul 2012	Presidential Assent	-	Granted			6 Aug 2012	
Cyprus	30 May 2012	House of Representatives	50%				3 Jul 2012	
Cyprus	22 Jun 2012	Presidential Assent	-	Granted			3 Jul 2012	
Czech Republic	25 Apr 2012	Senate	60% (absolute) min 49 votes	49	9	4	23 Apr 2013	
Czech Republic	5 Jun 2012	Chamber of Deputies	60% (absolute) min 120 votes	140	18	31	23 Apr 2013	
Czech Republic	3 Apr 2013	Presidential Assent	-	Granted			23 Apr 2013	
Denmark	23 Feb 2012	Folketing	50%	82	21	5	7 May 2012	
Denmark	21 Mar 2012	Royal Assent	-	Granted			7 May 2012	
Estonia	8 Aug 2012	Riigikogu	50%	86	0	2	7 Sep 2012	
Estonia	14 Aug 2012	Presidential Assent	-	Granted			7 Sep 2012	
Finland	9 May 2012	Parliament	50%	120	33	0	29 May 2012	
Finland	25 May 2012	Presidential Assent	-	Granted			29 May 2012	
France	28 Feb 2012	Senate	50%	168	27	138	2 Apr 2012	
France	21 Feb 2012	National Assembly	50%	256	44	131	2 Apr 2012	
France	7 Mar 2012	Presidential Assent	-	Granted			2 Apr 2012	
Germany	29 Jun 2012	Bundesrat	66.7%	65	0	4	27 Sep 2012	
Germany	29 Jun 2012	Bundestag	66.7%	504	97	1	27 Sep 2012	
Germany	13 Sep 2012	Presidential Assent	-	Granted			27 Sep 2012	
Greece	28 Mar 2012	Parliament	50%	194	59	0	17 Apr 2012	
Hungary	27 Feb 2012	National Assembly	66.7%	320	40	0	19 Apr 2012	
Hungary	5 Mar 2012	Presidential Assent	-	Granted			19 Apr 2012	
Ireland	27 Jun 2012	Senate	50%	Passed			1 Aug 2012	
Ireland	19 Jun 2012	Dáil	50%	Passed			1 Aug 2012	
Ireland	3 Jul 2012	Presidential Assent	-	Granted			1 Aug 2012	
Italy	12 Jul 2012	Senate	50%	230	22	14	25 Sep 2012	
Italy	19 Jul 2012	Chamber of Deputies	50%	380	59	36	25 Sep 2012	
Italy	23 Jul 2012	Presidential Assent	-	Granted			25 Sep 2012	
Latvia	19 Apr 2012	Parliament	50%	79	0	0	24 May 2012	
Latvia	9 May 2012	Presidential Assent	-	Granted			24 May 2012	
Lithuania	12 Jun 2012	Seimas	50% min 57 votes	81	0	8	6 Jul 2012	
Lithuania	21 Jun 2012	Presidential Assent	-	Granted			6 Jul 2012	
Luxembourg	26 Jun 2012	Chamber of Deputies	66.7%	48	5	0	24 Jul 2012	
Luxembourg	3 Jul 2012	Royal Assent	-	Granted			24 Jul 2012	
Malta	2 Oct 2012	House of Representatives	50%	Passed			9 Oct 2012	
Netherlands	3 Jul 2012	Senate	50%	50	23	0	20 Sep 2012	
Netherlands	24 May 2012	House of Representatives	50%	100	46	0	20 Sep 2012	
Netherlands	5 Jul 2012	Royal Assent	-	Granted			20 Sep 2012	
Poland	30 May 2012	Senate	50%	55	30	0	13 Nov 2012	
Poland	11 May 2012	Sejm	50%	294	155	1	13 Nov 2012	
Poland	26 Jun 2012	Presidential Assent	-	Granted			13 Nov 2012	
Portugal	9 Dec 2011	Assembly	50%				6 Feb 2012	
Portugal	2 Feb 2012	Presidential Assent	-	Granted			6 Feb 2012	
Romania	12 Jun 2012	Senate	66.7% (absolute) min 306 votes	307 (67.0%)	1	0	11 Jul 2012	
Romania	12 Jun 2012	House of Representatives	66.7% (absolute) min 306 votes	307 (67.0%)	1	0	11 Jul 2012	
Romania	19 Jun 2012	Presidential Assent	-	Granted			11 Jul 2012	
Slovakia	15 May 2012	National Council	60% (absolute) min 90 votes	130	11	1	13 Jun 2012	
Slovakia	9 Jul 2012	Presidential Assent	-	Granted			13 Jun 2012	
Slovenia	15 Jul 2011	National Assembly	50%	80	0	3	17 Oct 2011	
Slovenia	25 Jul 2011	Presidential Assent	-	Granted			17 Oct 2011	
Spain	6 Jun 2012	Senate	50% (absolute) min 134 votes	234	1	0	15 Jun 2012	
Spain	17 May 2012	Congress of Deputies	50% (absolute) min 176 votes	292	17	7	15 Jun 2012	
Spain		Royal Assent	-	Granted			15 Jun 2012	
Sweden	30 May 2012	Riksdagen	50%	295	19	0	15 Jun 2012	
United Kingdom	10 Sep 2012	House of Commons	50%	Passed			12 Nov 2012	
United Kingdom	4 Jul 2012	House of Lords	50%	Passed			12 Nov 2012	
United Kingdom	31 Oct 2012	Royal Assent	-	Granted			12 Nov 2012	

=== Ratification process ===
Austria

The opposition parties FPÖ, BZÖ and the Green Party threatened to launch a constitutional challenge against the European Fiscal Compact, with the FPÖ also intending to challenge the ESM. The Freedom Party of Carinthia, the largest party in the state assembly of Carinthia, also announced their intention to challenge Austria's ratification of the ESM. No cases can be launched prior to the publication of the treaties in Austria's official gazette, which would only take place at their entry into force. Constitutional Court President Gerhart Holzinger stated that the court could take three to six months to deliver a judgement, and that it "cannot abolish the ESM pact but we would only establish that the agreement of this pact was unconstitutional". If the court found the ratification unconstitutional, Holzinger stated that the government would have to "either defy the constitution by some means or other, or to negotiate after the fact with the other parties to the pact".

In October 2012, Heinz-Christian Strache, leader of the FPÖ, officially filed an individual constitutional challenge against the ESM, and the Government of Carinthia voted in favour of launching their own case. The Austrian Constitutional Court ruled on 25 February 2013 that Strache's petition was inadmissible on procedural grounds, and began deliberations on the Carinthian complaint on 6 March with a public hearing. On 3 April 2013 the court rejected the case, which argued that the treaty obliged Austria to make unlimited payments into the ESM, and ruled that the treaty was not unconstitutional.

Czech Republic

The TFEU amendment was passed by the Czech Senate on 25 April 2012 and the Chamber of Deputies on 5 June 2012. On 6 December the Senate urged then President Václav Klaus to give his assent, arguing that he is constitutionally obliged to do so "without undue delay" after both houses have given their approval. However, Klaus replied the next day by stating "I will never sign such a monstrous treaty". In March 2013 the Czech Senate voted to impeach Klaus for high treason, in part due to his refusal to sign the TFEU amendment, though the Constitutional Court of the Czech Republic rejected the charges on procedural grounds since the motion was passed only 3 days prior to Klaus being replaced as president by Miloš Zeman, the winner of the January presidential election which Klaus was term limited from running in. Zeman, who is considered to be "pro-EU", announced shortly after taking office that he would "respect parliament’s decision" and gave his assent to the TFEU amendment during President of the European Commission Jose Barroso's visit to the Czech Republic on 3 April.

Estonia

The Estonian Chancellor of Justice concluded that Article 4(4) of the ESM treaty may violate the Constitution of Estonia and could not be ratified by Parliament in its present form. The Chancellor demanded that the Government of Estonia re-open negotiations concerning the treaty. The matter was reviewed by the Supreme Court of Estonia and a decision was rendered on 12 July 2012. With a narrow 10–9 vote, the Court dismissed the application of the Chancellor and ruled that although Article 4(4) restricts the financial competence of the Estonian parliament, the principle of rule of law, and the sovereignty of Estonia, it does not breach the Constitution. The Court ruled that it is up to Parliament to decide whether Estonia accedes to the ESM.

Germany

A number of citizens, several members of parliament, and the Die Linke party in the Bundestag challenged the constitutionality of the ESM and petitioned the Constitutional Court to issue a preliminary injunction prohibiting President Joachim Gauck from signing the treaty. The President declared that he would postpone his signature until after the Court had ruled on the injunction. If the injunction was rejected, the President would sign the treaty, while if the Court granted the injunction the merits of the case would be decided while ratification remained on hold. If the Court ultimately decided that the treaty was unconstitutional, the treaty could not go into force in its current form. The Court heard oral arguments on 10 July 2012. A group of German academics filed an appeal to the Court requesting that the decision be delayed until the ECJ had issued a verdict on the legality of the treaty in the case referred to it by the Irish Supreme Court. While this could have delayed ratification by months, a spokesman for the court stated that "our understanding is that the court’s decision will go ahead". After the European Central Bank announced their intention to buy unlimited amounts of government bonds from troubled ESM states, another court challenge was launched requesting that ratification stop until this decision was reversed. While the court quickly rejected this case on procedural grounds, it didn't rule out the possibility that the case could be refiled.

On 12 September the Court refused to grant an injunction, but imposed several conditions for ratification. The argument that all future ESM bailouts should be individually approved by the German parliament was confirmed by the court. However, the court found that the argument that the treaty might permit the ESM to borrow funds directly from the ECB had no merit, as this was incompatible with the Treaty on the Functioning of the European Union. Finally, the court stipulated that Germany must attach an interpretative declaration to their instrument of ratification of the treaty declaring that their liability is limited to the €190 billion committed in the treaty unless an increase is approved by the German parliament, and that the confidentiality of information by the ESM will not prevent the German parliament from being informed on the workings of the ESM. Furthermore, the court stated that "Germany must express that it does not wish to be bound by the ESM Treaty in its entirety, if the reservations made by it should prove to be ineffective." On 27 September 2012, the eurozone countries adopted a joint interpretative declaration of the ESM treaty formalizing the "German interpretation". After a German court rejected a last minute appeal claiming that this declaration failed to satisfy the imposed requirements, Germany completed its ratification of the treaty. The court heard oral arguments on the merits of the case and the ECB's bond buying OMT program for countries exiting ESM financial support programs on 11–12 June 2013, with a final decision originally expected in the fall of 2013 but later pushed back to 2014. In early February 2014 the court announced that they had referred the question of the OMT program to the European Court of Justice, and on 18 March the court released their decision which found that all the complaints against the ESM treaty were either inadmissible or unfounded.

Ireland

Thomas Pringle, an independent member of the Oireachtas, challenged the legality of the ESM treaty under both Irish and European Union law. On 9 July 2012, High Court judge Mary Laffoy decided that the ESM treaty violated neither EU nor Irish law. However, she asked the European Court of Justice for a preliminary ruling on the legality of ratification of the ESM treaty prior to the entry into force of the TFEU amendment, which was planned for 1 January 2013 and intended to provide the intergovernmental ESM treaty with a legal basis within EU law. Pringle appealed the High Court decision to the Supreme Court. The appeal began on 24 July 2012, and on 31 July the court ruled that the ESM treaty did not involve a transfer of sovereignty such that it would require amending the constitution (which is only possible if approved by a referendum), and on those grounds rejected Pringle's application for an injunction to prevent the government from ratifying the ESM Treaty. However, the Irish Supreme Court referred three questions of EU law to the European Court of Justice (ECJ):

1. Is the EU Council decision of 25 March 2011 (to amend Article 136 of the TFEU on 1 January 2013) valid?
2. If so, is a member state entitled to join the ESM before the decision comes into force?
3. Is the ESM Treaty compatible with EU law?

The Irish Supreme Court requested that the case be heard urgently, and the ECJ agreed on 4 October to handle the case under an accelerated procedure, with a one-day hearing scheduled for 23 October 2012. Pringle stated that if he won the case, all ESM members would have to cease their membership and terminate the ESM as an intergovernmental organisation. However, on 27 November 2012 the ECJ delivered its judgement, answering all the questions submitted to it in an affirmative manner, and thus rejected Pringle's challenge. The ECJ found that the TFEU amendment did not expand the competence of the EU, and thus the use of the simplified treaty amendment procedure was legal. In addition, the ruling stated that the ESM treaty did not overrule any existing EU law and thus member states were permitted to join and enact the ESM treaty independent of whether the TFEU amendment had been ratified. It also highlighted that the ESM treaty basically replaced the intergovernmental temporary EFSF and the EU-law enacted EFSM, and that it did not limit the competence of the EU to introduce a similar support mechanism in the future.

Poland

The opposition to the government submitted a draft bill on 11 January 2012 outlining that a constitutional ratification procedure with the approval of a qualified majority of 2/3 of members of the Sejm, as is required for the ratification of international treaties which transfer political power to an international body, should be utilized for the TFEU amendment. This proposal was rejected on 10 May 2012 by a vote in Sejm, and the treaty was subsequently approved by a simple majority on 11 May 2012 with a vote of 63.9% in favour. Members of the opposition Law and Justice party filed a complaint with the Constitutional Tribunal of the Republic of Poland on 26 July 2012, requesting that the bill ratifying the treaty be declared illegal as it had not been passed by a qualified majority. Proceedings of the case began on 1 August 2012. The Sejm published their opinion on the case on 11 February 2013, which called on the Constitutional Tribunal to declare that the bill was not incompatible with the constitution and requested that the proceedings before the Tribunal be cancelled. After a hearing on 26 June 2013, the Tribunal ruled that the ratification procedure which was utilized did not violate the constitution.
