= PFI Convention =

2002 treaty of the European Union

The PFI Convention is a multilateral treaty between the old and new member states of the European Union on the topic of fraud, and came into force on 17 October 2002.

The full name of the treaty is the Convention on the protection of the European Communities' financial interests. It was introduced by the Council Act of 26 July 1995 drawing up the Convention on the protection of the European Communities' financial interests.

This convention harmonised the legal definition and criminal liability of fraud and replaced the old European treaties on fraud. It created a unified definition of fraud, and signatory states were to ensure that criminal sanctions were in effect for it. All EU Member states have ratified the convention, and it is available for accession by any future incoming EU member state.

The convention was replaced by the PFI Directive in all member states except Denmark and the United Kingdom, which have (or had) opt-outs, with effect from 6 July 2019.

== See also ==
- Fraud Act 2006
