= Popular initiative in Switzerland =

Law suggested by the people of Switzerland

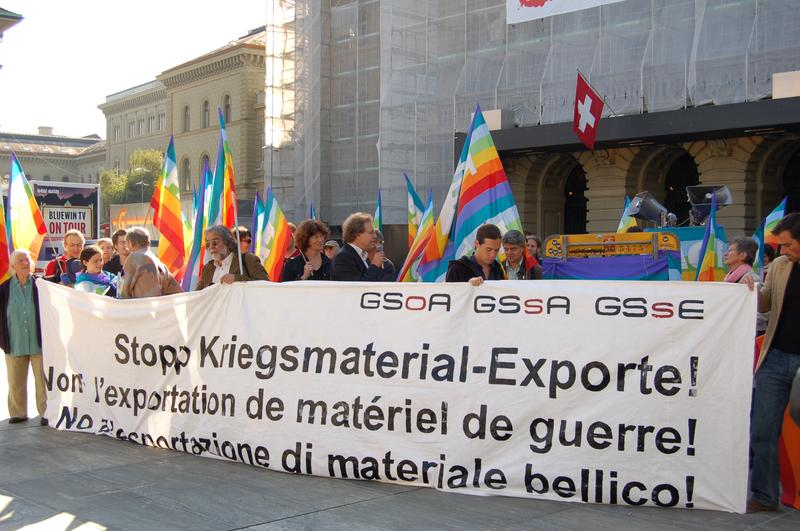
Demonstration, in front of the Federal Palace of Switzerland, in support of the federal popular initiative "for a ban on the export of military equipment", in 2007. The votation was organised on 29 November 2009.

In Switzerland, a popular initiative (German: Volksinitiative, French: initiative populaire, Italian: iniziativa popolare, Romansh: iniziativa dal pievel) allows people to suggest laws on a federal, cantonal, and municipal level.

On a federal level it may only change the federal constitution, not propose an ordinary law. Along with the popular referendum and in some cantons recall elections, it is a form of direct democracy.

== History ==
Popular initiatives were introduced as a tool at the federal level in the 1891 partial revision of the Swiss Federal Constitution. Between 1893 and 2014, out of a total of 192 federal initiatives put to the vote, 22 were successful. Another 73 were withdrawn, mostly in favour of a counter-proposal.

The first successful initiative was the first ever launched, asking for "prohibition of slaughter without prior anesthesia" (ostensibly phrased as a matter of animal rights, but in practice directed against shechita in particular, a practice that remains outlawed in Switzerland to the present day).

The successful initiatives date to the following years: 1893, 1908 (absinthe), 1918, 1920 (gambling), 1921, 1928 (gambling), 1949, 1982, 1987 (protection of wetlands), 1990 (nuclear power moratorium), 1993 (National Day), 1994 (protection of alpine ecosystems), 2002 (UN membership), 2004, 2005, 2008, 2009 (minaret ban), 2010, 2012, 2013 (executive pay), 2014 (immigration), 2014 (convicted child sex offender work ban).

Successful initiatives were thus quite rare, with a gap of 20 years during 1929–1949, and even of more than 30 years during 1949–1982 during which not a single initiative found favour with the electorate. In the 21st century, the picture changes significantly, with five successful initiatives during the 2000s, and another five just during 2010–2014.

Among the 170 rejected initiatives (as of October 2014), there are several that still played a major role in Swiss politics. Notable among them, also for the high voter turnout they inspired, were the anti-immigration initiatives of James Schwarzenbach in 1970 and 1974 (74.7% and 70.3% turnout, respectively), and the 1989 initiative with the aim of abolishing the Swiss Army (69.2% turnout).

== Federal popular initiative ==
The federal popular initiative (German: Eidgenössische Volksinitiative, French: Initiative populaire fédérale, Italian: Iniziativa popolare federale) is an instrument of direct democracy in Switzerland. It allows citizens to propose changes to the Swiss Federal Constitution. A votation will be organised for every proposition of modification that collected 100,000 valid signatures in 18 months.

The most frequent themes tackled by initiatives are healthcare, taxes, welfare, drug policy, public transport, immigration, asylum, and education. There are only two kinds of restrictions on the content:

- Formal criteria (the initiative should deal with one topic at a time, etc.)
- The initiative should not infringe on the core of the human rights, known as jus cogens.

It is different from the mandatory referendum in that in a popular initiative, the proposition to change the constitution comes from the population and not from the parliament. The authorities, even if they don't like it, cannot prevent an initiative which has collected enough signatures from being held, but they can make a counter proposal, known as counter-project.

A double majority of people and cantons is required to change the constitution.

Popular initiatives exist at the federal, cantonal, and municipal levels.

=== Suggested revisions ===
At the time of its introduction to the Swiss Constitution in 1891, the federal initiative system was initially meant to let groups that were not represented in the parliamentary process voice their concerns.

Since the 2000s, it has been increasingly used by political parties to bypass the parliamentary process. Some critics argue that it undermines the whole Swiss political system, based on compromise and adaptation to one another, as it suppresses any possibility to negotiate on an issue (an initiative can only be accepted or rejected as a whole). Others argue that it is democracy in its purest form.

Critics also argue that the multiplication of initiatives undermines the stability of the legal framework, as initiatives proposing drastic reforms are more and more frequent.

== Cantonal popular initiative ==
Comparison of popular initiative law in Swiss Cantons
Canton	Type	Signatures required	Signature Collection period	Counter Proposal	Notes
Aargau	Total constitutional revision	3,000 signatures	12 months	Counter proposal allowed	
Aargau	Constitutional amendment initiative	3,000 signatures	12 months	Counter proposal allowed	
Aargau	Legislative initiative	3,000 signatures	12 months	Counter proposal allowed	
Aargau	Regulated in: Constitution of the Canton of Aargau, Section 64 - 65				
Appenzell Innerrhoden	Total constitutional revision	1 eligible voter	N/A	Counter proposal allowed	
Appenzell Innerrhoden	Constitutional amendment initiative	1 eligible voter	N/A	Counter proposal allowed	
Appenzell Innerrhoden	Legislative initiative	1 eligible voter	N/A	Counter proposal allowed	
Appenzell Innerrhoden	Regulated in: Constitution of the Canton of Appenzell Innerrhoden, Art. 7				
Appenzell Ausserrhoden	Total constitutional revision	300 signatures		Counter proposal allowed	
Appenzell Ausserrhoden	Constitution amendment initiative	300 signatures		Counter proposal allowed	
Appenzell Ausserrhoden	Legislative initiative	300 signatures		Counter proposal allowed	
Appenzell Ausserrhoden	Regulated in: Constitution of the Canton of Appenzell Ausserrhoden, Art.51 a. - Art.55 e.				
Bern	Total constitutional revision	30,000 signatures	6 months	Counter proposal allowed	
Bern	Constitutional amendment initiative	15,000 signatures	6 months	Counter proposal allowed	
Bern	Legislative initiative	15,000 signatures	6 months	Counter proposal allowed	
Bern	Intercantonal / International contract negotiation	15,000 signatures	6 months	Counter proposal allowed	
Bern	Elaboration of government resolution	15,000 signatures	6 months	Counter proposal allowed	
Bern	Regulated by: Constitution of the Canton of Bern, Art. 58 - Art. 60				
Basel- Landschaft	Total constitutional revision	1,500 signatures	No limit		
Basel- Landschaft	Constitutional amendment initiative	1,500 signatures	No limit		
Basel- Landschaft	Legislative initiative	1,500 signatures	No limit		
Basel- Landschaft	Regulated by: Constitution of the Canton of Basel-Landschaft, Art. 28 - Art. 29				
Basel-Stadt	Total constitutional revision	3,000 signatures	18 months		
Basel-Stadt	Constitutional amendment initiative	3,000 signatures	18 months		
Basel-Stadt	Legislative initiative	3,000 signatures	18 months		
Basel-Stadt	Regulated by: Constitution of the Canton of Basel-Stadt,				
Fribourg	Total constitutional revision	6,000 signatures	90 days	Counter-proposal allowed	
Fribourg	Constitutional amendment	6,000 signatures	90 days	Counter-proposal allowed	
Fribourg	Legislative initiative	6,000 signatures	90 days	Counter-proposal allowed	
Fribourg	Regulated by: Constitution of the Canton of Fribourg,				
Geneva	Total constitutional revision	3% of eligible voters	4 months	Counter-proposal allowed	
Geneva	Constitutional amendment	3% of eligible voters	4 months	Counter-proposal allowed	
Geneva	Legislative initiative	2% of eligible voters	4 months	Counter-proposal allowed	
Geneva	Regulated by: Constitution of the Republic and Canton of Geneva, Art. 56 - Art. 64				
Glarus	Total constitutional revision	1 eligible voter	N/A		Municipalities may propose these initiatives
Glarus	Constitutional amendment	1 eligible voter	N/A		Municipalities may propose these initiatives
Glarus	Legislative initiative	1 eligible voter	N/A		Municipalities may propose these initiatives
Glarus	Regulated by: Constitution of the Canton of Glarus, Art. 58 and Art. 59				
Graubünden	Total constitutional revision	4,000 signatures	12 months	Counter proposal allowed	1/6 of municipalities may propose this initiative
Graubünden	Constitutional amendment	4,000 signatures	12 months	Counter proposal allowed	1/6 of municipalities may propose this initiative
Graubünden	Legislative initiative	3,000 signatures	12 months	Counter proposal allowed	1/7 of municipalities may propose this initiative
Graubünden	Regulated by: Constitution of the Canton of Graubünden, Art. 12 - Art. 15				
Jura	Total constitutional revision	5,000 signatures	No limit	Counter proposal allowed	5 municipalities may propose this initiative
Jura	Constitutional amendment	5,000 signatures	No limit	Counter proposal allowed	5 municipalities may propose this initiative
Jura	Ordinary law	5,000 signatures	No limit	Counter proposal allowed	5 municipalities may propose this initiative
Jura	Regulated by: Constitution of the Canton of Jura, Art. 75 - Art. 76				
Lucerne	Total constitutional revision	5,000 signatures	12 months	Counter proposal allowed	
Lucerne	Constitutional amendment	5,000 signatures	12 months	Counter proposal allowed	
Lucerne	Ordinary law	4,000 signatures	12 months	Counter proposal allowed	
Lucerne	Regulated by: Constitution of the Canton of Lucerne, Art. 20 - Art. 22				
Neuchâtel	Total constitutional revision	10,000 signatures	6 months	No counter proposal	
Neuchâtel	Constitutional amendment initiative	6,000 signatures	6 months	No counter proposal	
Neuchâtel	Legislative initiative	4,500 signatures	6 months	No counter proposal	
Neuchâtel	Regulated by: Constitution of the Canton of Neuchatel, Art. 40				
Nidwalden	Total constitutional revision	1,000 signatures	2 months	Counter proposal allowed	District administrator may propose this initiative
Nidwalden	Constitutional amendment initiative	500 signatures	2 months	Counter proposal allowed	District administrator may propose this initiative
Nidwalden	Legislative initiative	250 signatures	2 months	Counter proposal allowed	District administrator and municipalities may propose this initiative
Nidwalden	Regulated by: Constitution of the Canton of Nidwalden, Art. 54 - Art. 54 a.				
Obwalden	Total constitutional revision	500 signatures	No limit	Counter proposal allowed	
Obwalden	Constitutional amendment initiative	500 signatures	No limit	Counter proposal allowed	
Obwalden	Legislative initiative	500 signatures	No limit	Counter proposal allowed	
Obwalden	Regulated by: Constitution of Canton of Obwalden,				
St. Gallen	Total constitutional revision	8,000 signatures	5 months	Counter proposal allowed	
St. Gallen	Constitutional amendment initiative	8,000 signatures	5 months	Counter proposal allowed	
St. Gallen	Legislative initiative	6,000 signatures	5 months	Counter proposal allowed	This initiative is a fully formulated draft law.
St. Gallen	Unity initiative	4,000 signatures	5 months	Counter proposal allowed	This initiative is a general proposal for a law
St. Gallen	Regulated by: Constitution of the Canton of St. Gallen, Art. 41-43				

== See also ==
Some initiatives

- 1918 Swiss direct federal tax initiative
- 1918 Swiss proportional representation popular initiative
- 1949 Swiss direct democracy popular initiative
- 2010 Swiss expulsion initiative

Other related topics

- Citizens' Initiative Referendum
- Initiative
- Politics of Switzerland
- People's Initiative in the Philippines
- Swiss Federal Constitution
- Voting in Switzerland

== Bibliography ==
- Pierre Cormon, Swiss Politics for Complete Beginners, Editions Slatkine, 2014. ISBN 978-2-8321-0607-5
- Vincent Golay and Mix et Remix, Swiss political institutions, Éditions loisirs et pédagogie, 2008. ISBN 978-2-606-01295-3.
