= Withdrawal from the Council of Europe =

Legal process of Article 7 of the Statute of the Council of Europe

Withdrawal from the Council of Europe is the legal and political process whereby a member state of the Council of Europe rescinds from the Statute of the Council of Europe. Thus, the country in question ceases to be a member of the council. This is done under Articles 7 & 8 in Chapter II of the Statute which mentions membership. It states that any country that wishes to leave must send a notification to the Council of Europe's Secretary General, and the country’s membership would be rescinded by the end of the year.

As of March 2022, there have been two countries that have formally left the Council of Europe. The first one was Greece on 12 December 1969. However, it re-joined the council on the 28 November 1974. The second one is Russia who first threatened to withdraw from the Council, after the country's membership of the Parliamentary Assembly was revoked in 2014. This was due to the invasion and annexation of the Ukrainian autonomous region of Crimea. Russia formally notified the Council of its withdrawal on 15 March 2022, after the country invaded Ukraine, but was expelled the following day before the withdrawal could take effect.

== Procedure ==
According the Statute of the Council of Europe which is also known as the Treaty of London, there are two ways a member state can leave, that is either to be withdrawn or be suspended from the Council. These are listed in the Chapter II of the Statute, which deals with membership of the Council.

=== Article 7 ===
The first option is simple withdrawal, as stipulated in Article 7. The statute states:

Any member of the Council of Europe may withdraw by formally notifying the Secretary General of its intention to do so. Such withdrawal shall take effect at the end of the financial year in which it is notified, if the notification is given during the first nine months of that financial year. If the notification is given in the last three months of the financial year, it shall take effect at the end of the next financial year.

The article says that if a member state unilaterally wishes to formally leave the Council of Europe, then a member state would send a formal letter the Secretary General, asking that it would like leave the Council. If it is done between the 1 January and the 30 September, the withdrawment would happen at the 31 December on that year. If it is done between the 1 October to the 31 December, then it would happen on the 31 December the following year.

=== Article 8 ===
Another option is under Article 8, which the statue states:

Any member of the Council of Europe which has seriously violated Article 3 may be suspended from its rights of representation and requested by the Committee of Ministers to withdraw under Article 7. If such member does not comply with this request, the Committee may decide that it has ceased to be a member of the Council as from such date as the Committee may determine.

The article says which is where a member state seriously violated Article 3, the state would be referred to the Council’s executive body the Committee of Ministers, and the Committee would then ask the member state to withdraw under Article 7. If the member state refuses, then the Committee would revoke the member state's membership as and when the Committee decides.

== Withdrawals ==
=== Greece ===
Greece joined the Council as a member on 9 August 1949. On 21 April 1967, following a military coup, the Greek junta abolished democracy, bringing itself into conflict with the Council of Europe. In September 1967, Denmark, Norway, Sweden, and the Netherlands filed an interstate application with the Committee regarding human rights abuses in Greece. The Parliamentary Assembly of the Council of Europe also appointed a rapporteur, the former Dutch Foreign Minister Max van der Stoel, to investigate the situation in Greece.

On 12 December 1969, following the leaking of the Greek case report of the Committee, Greece left the Council of Europe before the matter could be brought to a vote. After the fall of the junta, Greece re-joined the Council of Europe on 28 November 1974.

=== Russia ===
Russia joined as a member on 28 February 1996. Russia was for the first time suspended from voting rights in Council's Parliamentary Assembly (PACE) from 2000 to 2001 because of the Second Chechen War.

During the Russo-Ukrainian war, Russia was suspended for a second time on the 10 April 2014, after the country militarily intervened and later annexed the southern Ukrainian region of Crimea in March 2014. After this suspension, Russia threatened to leave the Council in its entirety and had later withheld its funding payment to the Council totalling €53 million leading to cash crisis. On the 24 June 2019, a resolution led by France and Germany restored the delegates' voting rights and after that, Russia returned the funding to Council.

Due to the Russian invasion of Ukraine, on the 24 February 2022, the Committee of Ministers passed a resolution that "condemned in the strongest terms the armed attack on Ukraine," called for Russia to "immediately and unconditionally cease its military operations," and that it would consider "measures to be taken in response to the serious violation by the Russian Federation of its statutory obligations as a Council of Europe member State."

The next day on the 25 February the Committee voted for a motion that was backed by 42 of the 47 member states to immediately suspend Russia's voting privileges in both PACE and the Committee of Ministers. The only country besides Russia to vote against was Armenia; Azerbaijan did not attend and Turkey abstained. On the 14 March 2022, in an extraordinary session of the Parliamentary Assembly, Ukrainian prime minister Denys Shmyhal demanded by video link that Russia should be expelled under Article 8. On 15 March 2022, Russia announced its withdrawal from the Council of Europe under Article 7, effective 31 December 2022. On 16 March, the Committee of Ministers decided to expel Russia with immediate effect.

== Contemplated withdrawals ==
=== Azerbaijan ===
Azerbaijan joined the Council of Europe on 25 January 2001, together with Armenia. On the 13 July 2026, the Azerbaijani President Ilham Aliyev said during a conference in the Azeri city of Shusha, that he was mulling about quitting the Council. This comes of the back of Azerbaijan's suspension of the Parliamentary Assembly in 2024, which was over Azerbaijan's takeover of the Nagorno-Karabakh region.

=== Switzerland ===
In Switzerland, in 2018, there was a public vote on a popular initiative entitled ‘Swiss law, not foreign judges’ (Self-determination Initiative). The idea of the initiative, which was put forward by the populist right-wing Swiss People's Party was in cases of clear conflict between international law and Swiss law, Swiss law would take precedence. This would however, means Switzerland would de facto withdraw from the ECHR in case of conflicts with Swiss constitution. However, the initiative failed to achieve a majority of voters, with nearly two-thirds (64.7%) voting no.

=== Ukraine ===
Ukraine joined the Council of Europe as a full member on 9 November 1995. After the 2019 resolution readmitting Russia into the Council after the 2014 suspension, Ukrainian foreign minister Pavlo Klimkin recalled his permanent representative to the Council and threatened to voluntarily withdraw the country in retaliation.

=== United Kingdom ===
The United Kingdom was a founder member of the Council back in 1949. After leaving the European Union in 2020, there is speculation that the UK may try to retreat from various international bodies such as the Council of Europe's European Convention on Human Rights and the European Court of Human Rights. On the other hand, the United Kingdom is a party to the Good Friday Agreement of Northern Ireland, which requires that it incorporate the European Convention of Human Rights in the law of Northern Ireland.

== See also ==
- Members states of the Council of Europe
- Withdrawal from the European Union
- Withdrawal from NATO
