= 1918 Swiss proportional representation popular initiative =

Swiss popular vote

Federal popular initiative
Proportional Election of the National Council
- (Proportional representation initiative)
- Filed on: August 13, 1913
- Filed by: Social Democratic Party of Switzerland and Christian Democratic People's Party of Switzerland
- Counterproposal: no
- Voting: October 13, 1918
- Participation: 49.47%

Result: accepted (Note: According to Article 139 of the Constitution, an initiative proposed in the form of a drafted bill must be approved by both a majority of the people and a majority of the cantons. In the case of an initiative drafted in general terms, only the vote of the people is required.)
- By people: yes (by 66.8%)
- By cantons: yes (by 17 5/2) (Note: The first number indicates the total number of cantons, and the second indicates the number of cantons that count as half. For example, 20 6/2 is read as "20 cantons and 6 cantons that count as half.")

The Federal popular initiative "Proportional representation of the National Council" was a Swiss popular initiative that was approved by the people and the cantons on October 13, 1918.

== Proposal ==
The initiative proposed amending Article 73 of the Federal Constitution of Switzerland to make elections to the National Council direct and proportional instead of the majoritarian system then in place, and to use the cantons as electoral districts rather than electoral constituencies.

The full text of the initiative can be consulted on the website of the Federal Chancellery.

== Procedure ==
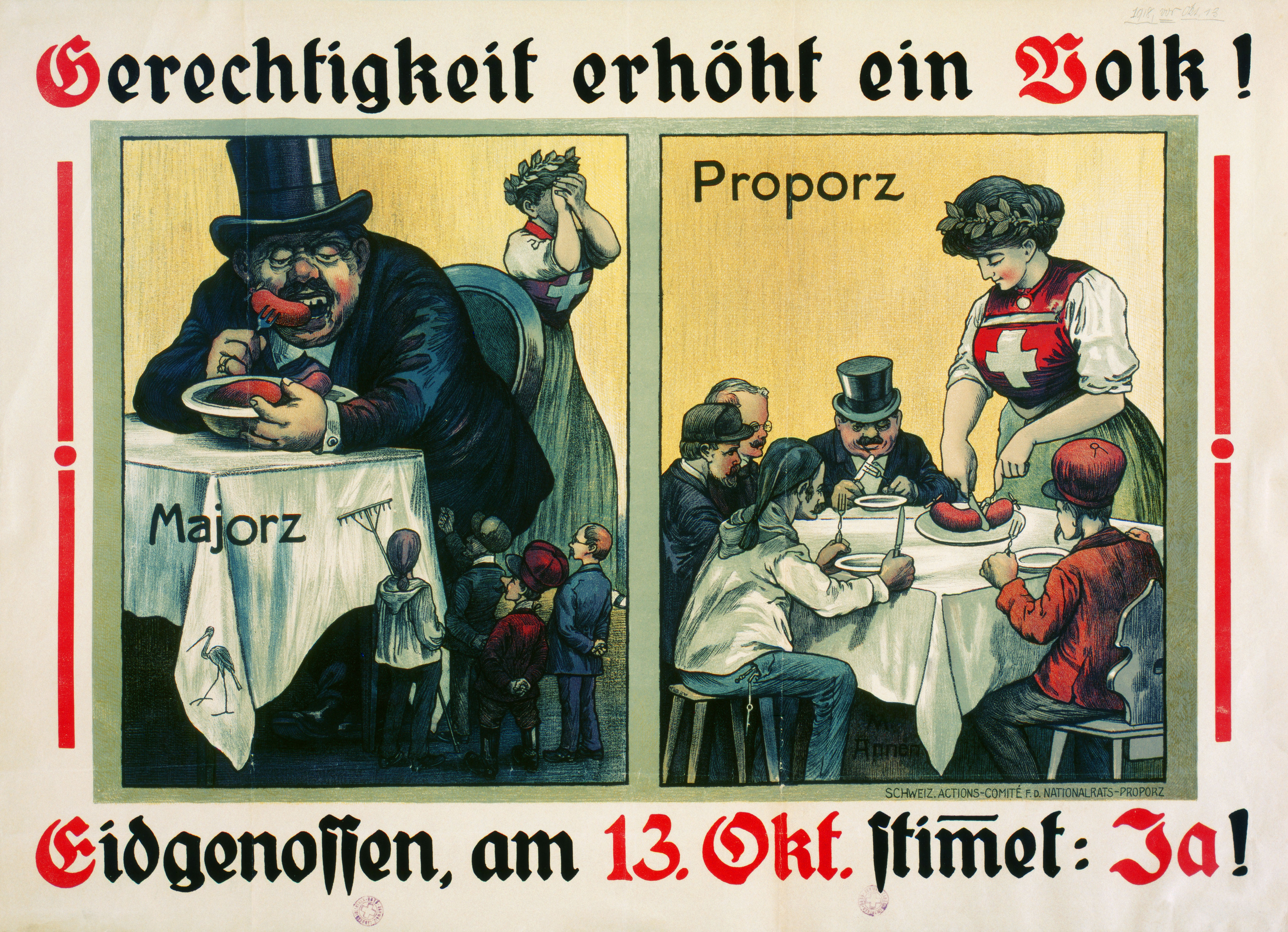
Propaganda poster in favor of proportional representation.

=== Historical background ===
When the Federal Constitution was adopted in 1848 and revised in 1874, the Radical Party, which held a large majority, established an electoral system for the federal chambers that favored the ruling party. From the introduction of the federal popular initiative in 1891 onward, opposition parties, led by the Social Democratic Party, sought to change this provision.

On November 4, 1900, a proposal to increase the number of Federal Councillors and elect them by popular vote was accompanied by a first proposal to elect members of the National Council by proportional representation. However, this proposal was rejected by nearly 60% of voters. The same issue was raised again in a second referendum on October 23, 1910, with a similar result; however, the majority in favor of rejection was reduced to 52% of the votes cast.

=== Signature collection and submission of the initiative ===
The collection of the required 50,000 signatures began on April 15, 1913. On August 13 of the same year, the initiative was submitted to the Federal Chancellery, which declared it valid on September 26.

=== Discussions and recommendations of the authorities ===
The Federal Assembly and the Federal Council both recommended rejecting the initiative.

In its report to the federal chambers, the government put forward two main reasons for opposing the reform. First, it placed referendums, decided by majority vote, and elections on the same footing, refusing to apply different systems to the two categories. Second, it questioned the appropriateness of granting state representation to movements seeking its destruction. Thus, "revolutionary tendencies that seek to overthrow the state, change the form of the state, or detach certain territories from the state, such as anarchist, royalist, and irredentist movements, do not deserve to be protected and represented.

=== Vote ===
Submitted to a vote on October 13, 1918, the initiative was approved by 17 5/2 cantons and by 66.8% of voters.

== Effects ==
Following the adoption of the initiative in October, the first demand of the general strike of November 1918 was the immediate re-election of the National Council based on proportional representation.

In the first National Council election under the new system in 1919, the Radical Party, previously dominant, lost 45 of its 105 seats and was forced to form an alliance with the Catholic Conservative Party (later the Christian Democratic People's Party), notably granting it a second seat on the Federal Council.

Following the Confederation, the cantons that had not yet done so also changed their electoral systems, with the exception of Appenzell Innerrhoden, Appenzell Ausserrhoden, Uri, and Graubünden, which in 2009 still used the majoritarian system
