= Withdrawal from the European Union =

Legal process of Article 50 of the Treaty of European Union

Article 50 of the Treaty on European Union (TEU) provides for the possibility of an EU member state leaving the European Union "in accordance with its own constitutional requirements".

Currently, the United Kingdom is the only state to have withdrawn from membership of the European Union. The process to do so began when the UK government triggered Article 50 to begin the UK's withdrawal from the EU on 29 March 2017 following a June 2016 referendum, and the withdrawal was scheduled in law to occur on 29 March 2019. Subsequently, the UK sought, and was granted, a number of extensions to its membership. On 23 January 2020, the withdrawal agreement was ratified by the Parliament of the United Kingdom, and on 29 January 2020 by the European Parliament. The UK left the EU on 31 January 2020 at 23:00 GMT, ending 47 years of membership.

Four territories of EU member states have withdrawn: French Algeria (in 1962, upon independence), Greenland (in 1985, following a referendum), Saint Pierre and Miquelon (also in 1985, unilaterally) and Saint Barthélemy (in 2012), the latter three becoming Overseas Countries and Territories of the European Union.

== Background ==
The states set to accede to the EU in 2004 pushed for an exit right during the 2002–2003 European Convention. The acceding states wanted the option to exit the EU in the event that EU membership would adversely affect them. During negotiations, eurosceptics in states such as the UK and Denmark subsequently pushed for the creation of Article 50.

Article 50, which allows a member state to withdraw, was originally drafted by British cross-bench peer and former diplomat Lord Kerr of Kinlochard, the secretary-general of the European Convention, which drafted the Constitutional Treaty for the European Union. Following the failure of the ratification process for the European Constitution, the clause was incorporated into the Treaty of Lisbon which entered into force in 2009.

Prior to this, no provision in the treaties or law of the EU outlined the ability of a state to voluntarily withdraw from the EU. The absence of such a provision made withdrawal technically difficult but not impossible. Legally there were two interpretations of whether a state could leave. The first, that sovereign states have a right to withdraw from their international commitments; and the second, the treaties are for an unlimited period, with no provision for withdrawal and calling for an "ever closer union" – such commitment to unification is incompatible with a unilateral withdrawal. The Vienna Convention on the Law of Treaties states where a party wants to withdraw unilaterally from a treaty that is silent on such procedure, there are only two cases where withdrawal is allowed: where all parties recognise an informal right to do so and where the situation has changed so drastically, that the obligations of a signatory have been radically transformed.

== Procedure ==
Article 50 of the Treaty on European Union, enacted by the Treaty of Lisbon on 1 December 2009, introduced for the first time a procedure for a member state to withdraw voluntarily from the EU. The article states that:

1. Any Member State may decide to withdraw from the Union in accordance with its own constitutional requirements.
2. A Member State which decides to withdraw shall notify the European Council of its intention. In the light of the guidelines provided by the European Council, the Union shall negotiate and conclude an agreement with that State, setting out the arrangements for its withdrawal, taking account of the framework for its future relationship with the Union. That agreement shall be negotiated in accordance with Article 218(3) of the Treaty on the Functioning of the European Union. It shall be concluded on behalf of the Union by the Council [of the European Union], acting by a qualified majority, after obtaining the consent of the European Parliament.
3. The Treaties shall cease to apply to the State in question from the date of entry into force of the withdrawal agreement or, failing that, two years after the notification referred to in paragraph 2, unless the European Council, in agreement with the Member State concerned, unanimously decides to extend this period.
4. For the purposes of paragraphs 2 and 3, the member of the European Council or of the Council representing the withdrawing Member State shall not participate in the discussions of the European Council or Council or in decisions concerning it.
  A qualified majority shall be defined in accordance with Article 238(3)(b) of the Treaty on the Functioning of the European Union.
5. If a State which has withdrawn from the Union asks to rejoin, its request shall be subject to the procedure referred to in Article 49.

This provision does not cover certain overseas territories which under TFEU Article 355 do not require a full treaty revision.

=== Invocation ===
Thus, once a member state has notified the European Council of its intention to leave, a period begins during which a withdrawal agreement is negotiated, setting out the arrangements for the withdrawal and outlining the country's future relationship with the Union. Commencing the process is up to the member state that intends to leave.

The article allows for a negotiated withdrawal, due to the complexities of leaving the EU. However, it does include in it a strong implication of a unilateral right to withdraw. This is through the fact that a state would decide to withdraw "in accordance with its own constitutional requirements" and that the end of the treaties' application in a member state that intends to withdraw is not dependent on any agreement being reached (it would occur after two years regardless).

=== Negotiation ===
The treaties cease to apply to the member state concerned on the entry into force of the withdrawal agreement or, in the absence of such an agreement, two years after the member state notified the European Council of its intention to leave, although this period can be extended by unanimous agreement of the European Council.

The leaving agreement is negotiated on behalf of the EU by the European Commission on the basis of a mandate given by the remaining Member States, meeting in the Council of the European Union. It must set out the arrangements for withdrawal, taking account of the framework for the member state's future relationship with the EU, though without itself settling that framework. The agreement is to be approved on the EU side by the Council of the EU, acting by qualified majority, after obtaining the consent of the European Parliament. For the agreement to pass the Council of the EU it needs to be approved by at least 72 percent of the continuing member states representing at least 65 percent of their population.

The agreement is concluded on behalf of the Union by the council and must set out the arrangements for withdrawal, including a framework for the State's future relationship with the Union, negotiated in accordance with Article 218(3) of the Treaty on the Functioning of the European Union. The agreement is to be approved by the council, acting by qualified majority, after obtaining the consent of the European Parliament. Should a former member state seek to rejoin the European Union, it would be subject to the same conditions as any other applicant country.

Remaining members of the EU would need to manage consequential changes over the EU's budgets, voting allocations and policies brought about by the withdrawal of any member state.

=== Failure of negotiations ===
This system provides for a negotiated withdrawal, rather than an abrupt exit from the Union. This preference for a negotiated withdrawal is based on the expected complexities of leaving the EU (including concerning the euro) when so much European law is codified in member states' laws. However, the process of Article 50 also includes a strong implication of unilateral right to withdraw. This is through the fact the state would decide "in accordance with its own constitutional requirements" and that the end of the treaties' application in said state is not dependent on any agreement being reached (it would occur after two years regardless). In other words, the European Union can not block a member state from leaving.

If negotiations do not result in a ratified agreement, the withdrawing country leaves without an agreement, and the EU Treaties shall cease to apply to the withdrawing country, without any substitute or transitional arrangements being put in place. As regards trade, the parties would likely follow World Trade Organization rules on tariffs.

=== Re-entry or unilateral revocation ===
Article 50 does not spell out whether member states can rescind their notification of their intention to withdraw during the negotiation period while their country is still a member of the European Union. However, the president of the European Council said to the European Parliament on 24 October 2017 that “deal, no deal or no Brexit” is up to Britain. Indeed, the prevailing legal opinion among EU law experts and the EU institutions themselves is that a member state intending to leave may change its mind, as an “intention” is not yet a deed and intentions can change before the deed is done. Until the Scottish Government did so in late 2018, the issue had been untested in court. On 10 December 2018, the European Court of Justice ruled that it would be “inconsistent with the EU treaties’ purpose of creating an ever closer union among the peoples of Europe to force the withdrawal of a member state” against its wishes, and that consequently an Article 50 notification may be revoked unilaterally by the notifying member without the permission of the other EU members, provided the state has not already left the EU, and provided the revocation is decided “following a democratic process in accordance with national constitutional requirements”.

The European Parliament resolution of 5 April 2017 (on negotiations with the United Kingdom following its notification that it intends to withdraw from the European Union) states, "a revocation of notification needs to be subject to conditions set by all EU-27, (Note: In this context, EU-27 means the 27 European Union countries involved in Brexit negotiations with the UK; in other words, the EU (as of 2017) except for the United Kingdom. Historically, EU-27 was used as shorthand for the membership prior to the accession of Croatia.) so that it cannot be used as a procedural device or abused in an attempt to improve on the current terms of the United Kingdom’s membership." The European Union Policy Department for Citizens' Rights and Constitutional Affairs has stated that a hypothetical right of revocation can only be examined and confirmed or infirmed by the EU institution competent to this purpose, namely the CJEU. In addition the European Commission considers that Article 50 does not provide for the unilateral withdrawal of the notification. Lord Kerr, the British author of Article 50, also considers the process is reversible as does Jens Dammann. Professor Stephen Weatherill disagrees. Former Brexit Secretary David Davis has stated that the British Government "does not know for sure" whether Article 50 is revocable; the British prime minister [then Theresa May] "does not intend" to reverse it.

Extension of the two years time from notification to exit from the union, still requires unanimous support from all member countries, that is clearly stated in Article 50(3).

Should a former member state seek to rejoin the European Union after having actually left, it would be subject to the same conditions as any other applicant country and need to negotiate a Treaty of Accession, ratified by every member state.

== Outermost regions ==
TFEU Article 355(6), introduced by the Treaty of Lisbon allows the status of French, Dutch and Danish overseas territories to be changed more easily, by no longer requiring a full treaty revision. Instead, the European Council may, on the initiative of the member state concerned, change the status of an overseas country or territory (OCT) to an outermost region (OMR) or vice versa.

== Withdrawals ==
Some former territories of European Union members broke formal links with the EU when they gained independence from their ruling country or were transferred to an EU non-member state. Most of these territories were not classed as part of the EU, but were at most associated with OCT status, and EC laws were generally not in force in these countries.

Some current territories changed or are in the process of changing their status so that, instead of EU law applying fully or with limited exceptions, EU law mostly will not apply. The process also occurs in the opposite direction, as formal enlargements of the union occur. The procedure for implementing such changes was made easier by the Treaty of Lisbon.

=== Past withdrawals ===
==== Territories ====
===== Algeria =====
Algeria joined the European Communities as an integral part of the French Republic, since legally it was not an overseas territory of France but rather one of its overseas departments. Upon its independence in 1962, Algeria ceased to be part of France. However, the implications of Algeria's independence on its relationship with the EEC was legally unresolved, since the Treaty of Rome, which explicitly referred to Algeria by name as subject to the treaty's provisions, was not immediately amended. In 1976 a bilateral treaty was agreed to between Algeria and the EEC which formalized the EEC's relationship with Algeria as a neighbouring state in association with the Community, and not a part of the Community.

===== Greenland =====
Greenland chose to leave the EU predecessor without separating from Denmark. It initially voted against joining the EEC when Denmark joined in 1973, but because Denmark as a whole voted to join, Greenland, as a county of Denmark, joined too. When home rule for Greenland began in 1979, it held a new referendum and voted to leave the EEC. After wrangling over fishing rights, the territory left the EEC in 1985, but remains subject to the EU treaties through association of Overseas Countries and Territories with the EU. This was permitted by the Greenland Treaty, a special treaty signed in 1984 to allow its withdrawal.

===== Saint Pierre and Miquelon =====
Saint Pierre and Miquelon, an island territory of France, but neighbouring Canada, used to be part of the EU but left on 11 June 1985.

===== Saint Barthélemy =====
Saint Martin and Saint-Barthélemy in 2007 separated from Guadeloupe (overseas department of France and outermost region (OMR) of the EU) and became overseas collectivities of France, but at the same time remained OMRs of the European Union. Later, the elected representatives of the island of Saint-Barthélemy expressed a desire to "obtain a European status which would be better suited to its status under domestic law, particularly given its remoteness from the mainland, its small insular economy largely devoted to tourism and subject to difficulties in obtaining supplies which hamper the application of some European Union standards." France, reflecting this desire, requested at the European Council to change the status of Saint Barthélemy to an overseas country or territory (OCT) associated with the European Union. The status change came into effect from 1 January 2012.

==== Member states ====
===== United Kingdom =====
Letter from Theresa May invoking Article 50

The UK formally left the EU on 31 January 2020, following on a public vote held in June 2016. However, the country benefited from a transition period to give time to negotiate a trade deal between the UK and the EU.

The British government led by David Cameron held a referendum on the issue in 2016; the electorate decided by a 3.8% majority to favour leaving the European Union. On 29 March 2017, arising from a decision by the Parliament of the United Kingdom, Prime Minister Theresa May invoked Article 50 in a letter to the president of the European Council, Donald Tusk. The UK ceased to be an EU member state as from 00:00, 1 February 2020 Central European Time (UTC+1) (23:00, 31 January 2020 Western European Time (GMT, UTC+0). Following the UK Parliament's decisions not to ratify the Brexit withdrawal agreement negotiated between the European Council and the UK government, several extensions of the deadline were agreed.

Following a decisive election victory for Prime Minister Boris Johnson and the Conservative Party in December 2019, the UK Parliament ratified the European Union (Withdrawal Agreement) Act 2020, approving the terms of withdrawal as formally agreed between the UK government and the EU Commission. After the European Parliament ratified the agreement on 29 January, the United Kingdom withdrew from the European Union at 23:00 London time (GMT) on 31 January 2020, with a withdrawal agreement in place.

=== Advocates in other countries for withdrawal ===
Several states have political parties represented in national assemblies or the European Parliament that advocate withdrawal from the EU.

As of 2024, no country other than the United Kingdom has voted on whether to withdraw from the EU. Political parties criticizing the federative trend of the European Union and advocating withdrawal have gained prominence in several member states since the European Parliament election in 2014, similarly to the rise of UKIP in the United Kingdom. The EU Exit Index, which measures the risk of member states leaving the EU, shows that the UK was a clear outlier and no other state is likely to leave the EU in the foreseeable future.

==== Austria ====
In July 2001, the Austrian parliament debated a call by Aktion EU-Austritt to hold a referendum on taking Austria out of the EU. Aktion EU-Austritt collected over 100,000 signatures demanding a referendum. According to Austrian law, the issue has to go before parliament if at least 100,000 signatures are collected. The government was not obliged to hold a referendum and ultimately one was not held, primarily because withdrawal from the EU was not supported by any parliamentary party.

In 2015, the Austrian parliament debated the issue again after a further action collected more than the 100'000 signatures required. Again, no referendum was held, mainly because withdrawal from the EU was again not supported by any parliamentary party.

==== Bulgaria ====
In Bulgaria, the far-right Revival party, and third largest party in the National Assembly as of 2023, supports either "renegotiation" for special status within the EU, or withdrawal. Additionally, other smaller non-parliamentary parties, mostly from the coalition Neutral Bulgaria support withdrawal, such as Attack who called the politicians who signed the treaty to join the EU "traitors."

==== Czech Republic ====
In the Czech Republic, the far-right Freedom and Direct Democracy party opposes Czech membership of the European Union.

==== Denmark ====
In the Danish Parliament, the national conservative New Right party opposes Denmark's membership in the EU. The ideologically similar Danish People's Party in principle opposes EU membership, but has since 2001 in practice supported pro-EU right-wing coalitions. The party's support of the common market and opt-in/opt-out solutions was reflected in the slogan Mere Danmark, mindre EU ("More Denmark, less EU"). In 2020, the party proclaimed a strengthening of its anti-EU stance. The left-wing Red Green Alliance which is the 3rd largest party in the country, still officially opposes EU membership, but its members are divided on the issue.

In the European Parliament, the Danish People's Movement against the EU was represented from the first direct elections in 1979 until 2019. The Unity List is a collective member of The People's Movement and used to only participate in European Elections as candidates for The People's Movement. At the 2019 EP Election the Unity List participated independently and gained a seat, in an electoral alliance with The People's Movement who lost their seat. Former MEP for The People's Movement Rina Ronja Kari resigned her personal membership of the Unity List.

Opinion polls have mostly shown that Danes are pro EU membership, but eurosceptic. A 2018 opinion poll suggested that while a minority of Danes wanted withdrawal (12% "to a high degree" and 16% "to some degree"), a large majority were against abolishing the opt-outs (57 % against and 22 % for the euro; 42 % against and 30 % for defense cooperation; 47 % against and 22 % for judicial cooperation). A 2019 opinion poll showed that 37 % of voters of the New Right wanted withdrawal and other 50 % were eurosceptic ("remain in the EU, but the EU should have less influence on Danish conditions"). Among voters of the Danish People's party, the numbers were 18% and 57%, and of the Unity List, 11% and 42%, respectively. In all other parties, withdrawal was supported by 5% of voters or less, but there was substantial euroscepticism (between 26 and 32%), although less among voters of the Social Liberal Party (15%) and The Alternative (20%).

Occasionally, polls about a choice between the EU and a Nordic cooperation have shown equally divided support; a 2020 poll showed 39% support for each alternative. In a 2019 poll, the same question showed 42.7% support for the Nordic option and 40.5% for the EU option.

==== Finland ====
In Finland, the Finns Party says the country should leave the EU should it become a European Federation, a proposal which was not being considered at European level.

==== France ====
Until 2018, the far-right National Rally advocated for France to leave the EU. However, shortly after the party's renaming (from Front National), the party leader Marine Le Pen ruled out that policy, proposing instead to focus on changing the European Union's institutions.

The Popular Republican Union and The Patriots party support France leaving the EU.

==== Greece ====
In Greece, Greek Solution is campaigning for a withdrawal, as was Golden Dawn.

==== Hungary ====
As a result of the approval of an anti-LGBTQ law, it has been suggested that Hungary should leave the EU. Currently, Our Homeland Movement is the only party that has proposed doing so through a referendum.

==== Italy ====
In July 2020, Italian journalist and senator Gianluigi Paragone formed Italexit, a new political party with a main goal to withdraw Italy from the European Union.

==== Netherlands ====
In the Netherlands, the main party advocating for a withdrawal is Forum for Democracy, additionally Party for Freedom also supports a withdrawal from the European Union.

==== Poland ====
In Poland, the far-right party Confederation Liberty and Independence is against the membership of the country in the European Union. Following the 2023 Polish parliamentary election, the party has eighteen (out of 460) members of the Sejm, zero members of the Senate, zero members of the European Parliament and one member of a Regional Assembly - this being an increase of seven members in the Sejm and one in regional assemblies since the previous election.

==== Romania ====
In Romania, the small right-wing party Noua Dreaptă opposes Romania's membership of the European Union and NATO. At the end of 2020, the party had no members of the national assembly or in the European Parliament. By December 2020, the fellow Eurosceptic and far-right party Alliance for the Union of Romanians (AUR) entered the parliament for the first time and became the 4th largest party in the country, although it is unclear whether the party supports leaving the EU or not.

==== Sweden ====
In Sweden, the Alternative for Sweden is the biggest party in Sweden that supports Sweden's withdrawal from the European Union. It has no representatives in the parliament of Sweden. In the 2019 European Parliament elections, the party ran on an anti-EU platform, receiving 0.46% of the vote.

=== Break-up of an existing member state and internal enlargement ===
There are no clear agreements, treaties or precedents covering the scenario of an existing EU member state breaking into two or more states. The question is whether one state is a successor rump state which remains a member of the EU and the other is a new state which must reapply and be accepted by all other member states to remain in the EU, or alternatively whether both states retain their EU membership following the break-up.

In some cases, a region leaving its state would leave the EU – for example, if any of the various proposals for the enlargement of Switzerland from surrounding countries were to be implemented at a future date.

During the failed Scottish independence referendum of 2014, the European Commission said that any newly independent country would be considered as a new state which would have to negotiate with the EU to rejoin, though EU experts also suggested transitional arrangements and an expedited process could apply. Political considerations are likely to have a significant influence on the process; in the case of Catalonia, for example, other EU member states may have an interest in blocking an independent Catalonia's EU membership in order to deter independence movements within their own borders.

== Legal effect on EU citizenship ==
Citizenship of the European Union is dependent on citizenship (nationality) of a member state, and citizenship remains a competence entirely vested with the member states. Citizenship of the EU can therefore only be acquired or lost by the acquisition or loss of citizenship of a member state. A probable but untested consequence of a country withdrawing from the EU is that, without otherwise negotiated and then legally implemented, its citizens are no longer citizens of the EU. But the automatic loss of EU citizenship as a result of a member state withdrawing from the EU is the subject of debate.

== Expulsion ==
While a state can leave, there is no provision for a state to be expelled. But TEU Article 7 provides for the suspension of certain rights of a member state if a member persistently breaches the EU's founding values.

== See also ==
- Anti-Europeanism
- Withdrawal from the Council of Europe
- Withdrawal from the eurozone
- Withdrawal from NATO
- Special territories of members of the European Economic Area § Former special territories
