= Withdrawal from NATO =

Legal process of Article 13 of the North Atlantic Treaty

Flag of NATO

Withdrawal from NATO is the legal and political process whereby a member of the North Atlantic Treaty Organisation (NATO) withdraws from the North Atlantic Treaty, and thus the country in question ceases to be a member of NATO. The formal process is stated in article 13 of the Treaty. This says that any country that wants to leave must send the United States (as the depositary state) a "notice of denunciation", which the U.S. would then pass on to the other Allies. After a one-year waiting period, the country that wants to leave would be out.

As of 2026, no member state has rescinded their membership, although it has been considered by several countries. Notwithstanding, a number of former dependencies of NATO members have never applied for membership subsequent to their becoming independent states.

== Procedure ==
Article 13 of the North Atlantic Treaty is the article that member states use for informing other members or parties that it wishes to leave the North Atlantic Treaty Organisation. It states the following:

After the Treaty has been in force for twenty years, any Party may cease to be a Party one year after its notice of denunciation has been given to the Government of the United States of America, which will inform the Governments of the other Parties of the deposit of each notice of denunciation.

This means that after 20 years since the signing of the original treaty, which was in 1949, thus since 1969, any member state that wishes to leave just has to inform the United States that it wants to leave, and then after a year it formally leaves.

Despite calls for a number of countries, including Turkey, to be expelled from NATO, there is no mechanism in the treaty for expelling member states, only voluntary withdrawals. This was confirmed by secretary general Jens Stoltenberg in 2021 at a meeting in Riga, Latvia.

== Contemplated withdrawals ==
=== Bulgaria ===
The far-right Revival party supports Bulgarian withdrawal from NATO.

=== Canada ===
Canada is a founding member of NATO and remains a member. In 2019, the Green Party advocated a review of Canadian membership of the alliance. The position of the social-democratic New Democratic Party is complicated; while there is general support for NATO membership within the party, including from former party leaders Jack Layton and Tom Mulcair, the NDP Socialist Caucus advocates revoking Canada's membership. Some of the reasons for opposition to membership of the alliance include membership being incompatible to the Canadian tradition of peacekeeping and concerns of Canadian sovereignty over its defence forces.

As of 2022, the Canadian political consensus is to support NATO membership as part of national defence policy. Parties with representation in the Parliament of Canada that support NATO membership include the governing Liberal Party, the opposition Conservative Party, and the Quebec sovereigntist Bloc Québécois.

=== Denmark ===
The far-left Enhedslisten until 2022 supported withdrawal from NATO. The party subsequently adopted a position affirming a critical approach towards NATO but no longer supporting withdrawal until an "alternative" exists.

=== France ===
In 1966, due to souring relations between Washington and Paris because of the refusal to integrate France's nuclear deterrent with other North Atlantic powers, or to accept any collective form of control over its army, French president Charles de Gaulle downgraded France's membership in NATO and withdrew France from the NATO Military Command Structure to pursue more independent defense options. However, he also stated that France would remain in the alliance even after the end of the 20-year commitment period in 1969, unless the "fundamental elements of the relations between East and West" changed.

In 1967, following de Gaulle's decision, all of NATO's 30-odd bases in France (consisting mostly of U.S. forces) were evacuated, along with 27,000 troops and 37,000 civilians. NATO headquarters left les Yvelines and moved to Belgium.

In 2009, France rejoined the NATO Military Command Structure. The reversal was announced by President Nicolas Sarkozy and backed by the Parliament of France.

Currently, of the noted political parties in France; those advocating withdrawal from NATO include the souverainist Popular Republican Union, together with the left-wing La France Insoumise and the far left French Communist Party. The right-wing Gaullist Debout la France and the nationalist National Rally advocate reversing the 2009 decision for France returning to NATO command. In a July 2024 poll, 54% of French people viewed NATO favorably, and 37% unfavorably.

=== Germany ===
During the conversations leading to the German reunification, the Soviet Union sought to move the union of West Germany (in NATO) and East Germany (in the Warsaw Pact) into neutrality and de-nuclearization. However, West German chancellor Helmut Kohl and American president George H. W. Bush wanted the united Germany to remain in NATO in spite of considerable scepticism among West Germans wanting to remain in NATO after the reunification (as low as 20% according to a SPIEGEL report). Mikhail Gorbachev finally removed the Soviet objection and the new eastern territories of Germany became covered by NATO on the condition that no foreign forces or weapons of mass destruction were to be located on them.

Die Linke, a left-wing political party in the Bundestag opposes military alliances, including NATO membership.

=== Greece ===
In 1974 due to the Cyprus crisis, Greece withdrew military units from NATO forces in the Southern Mediterranean, over threats of invasion of Cyprus by fellow NATO member Turkey. Later in 1974 due to the invasion of Cyprus by Turkish forces, Greece withdrew from the NATO military command. Notwithstanding, the country did not withdraw entirely from the organisation, but became significantly less active.

In 1980, the Greek foreign minister Konstantinos Mitsotakis made remarks about the situation where he could see Greece fully withdrawing from the organisation. However, later diplomatic pressure from the United States led to Greece fully re-integrating with the alliance.

According to a poll conducted in 2022, NATO remains popular among the Greek public with 78% wanting to remain in the alliance and only 18% wanting to leave.

=== Iceland ===
Iceland is unique amongst NATO members in that it does not have a standing army, and its defence forces consist of a militarised coastguard and a paramilitary peacekeeping force. Iceland's strong pacifist history has led to considerable opposition to NATO membership in Iceland. Nevertheless, the country was a host to the notable United States Navy base at Keflavík airport, near the country's capital Reykjavík.

The country's main nonpartisan pressure group for Iceland leaving NATO is Samtök hernaðarandstæðinga, which is a branch of War Resisters' International.

In 2019, during a visit by the Secretary-General Jens Stoltenberg to Iceland, Prime Minister Katrín Jakobsdóttir spoke of her support for withdrawing Iceland from NATO. Her party, the Left-Green Movement, is the senior partner of the Icelandic government, which also supports withdrawing, but there is not a majority in the Icelandic parliament for withdrawing. As of May 2022, she continues to oppose Icelandic membership in NATO.

A Gallup poll taken in April 2025 showed that 71% of Icelanders supported the country's NATO membership, while 12% were opposed.

=== Montenegro ===
Several political parties in Montenegro, including New Serb Democracy and the Democratic People's Party, oppose NATO membership. The 2020 Montenegrin parliamentary election resulted in a victory for these parties for the first time in 30 years. However, these parties did not formally pursue withdrawal upon taking office.

=== North Macedonia ===
The left-wing Levica party supports withdrawal of North Macedonia from NATO.

=== Netherlands ===
The Dutch consensus about foreign and defence policy is to remain a member of the alliance. Its membership is supported by all five main establishment parties in the Staten-General; the conservative-liberal VVD, the social-democratic PvdA, the Christian-democrat CDA, right-wing populist PVV, and social-liberal D66. Other parties are supportive but would like to reform the alliance, such as the green-social democratic GroenLinks.

While the far-right populist Forum voor Democratie supports NATO membership, it was reported by the investigative show Zembla that privately the party's leader Thierry Baudet would like the Netherlands to leave NATO and align the country's foreign policy with Russia.

=== Romania ===
Some minor political parties in Romania oppose Romanian membership in NATO. One of them is Noua Dreaptă, which is also against the European Union.

=== Spain ===
Spain joined the alliance in 1982 under the UCD-led conservative government of Calvo-Sotelo. However, this was opposed by a significant portion of Spanish society especially on the left and pacifist groups. Under the social democratic González government in March 1986, Spain had a referendum on NATO membership in which both the main social democratic PSOE and conservative AP parties supported membership. The result was a "yes" vote, but with strong opposing results in separatist regions of the Canary Islands, Basque Country, Navarre and Catalonia. Opposition to NATO led to the creation of the left-wing United Left-linked pacifist pressure group “La Plataforma Cívica por la Salida de España de la OTAN”. Although the referendum result was conditional on a stipulated non-integration of Spain’s armed forces into NATO's structure, in 1996 Spain fully joined NATO.

Today, membership is opposed by a number of left-wing and separatist political parties. These include the left-wing United Left and Podemos, Basque separatist EH Bildu, Galician nationalist BNG and left-wing Catalan-separatist CUP who have either advocated withdrawal or downgrading Spain’s membership. Other groups that support Spanish withdrawal include the State Coordination Against NATO and Bases (CECOB) and the Coordinator for Total Disarmament and Denuclearization (CDDT).

=== Slovakia ===
The far-right Republic Movement party advocates for the withdrawal of Slovakia from NATO.

=== Turkey ===
Since the 2016 attempted coup d'état, the 2019 Turkish Offensive into northeastern Syria, the deterioration of relations between Turkey and the United States, the deterioration of relations between Greece and Turkey, warming relations between Turkey and Russia, and opposition towards Finland and Sweden in their membership bids in 2022 which led to delays in joining the alliance, there have been calls for Turkey to leave or be thrown out of NATO.

Inside Turkey, politicians like the Nationalist Movement Party (MHP) leader Devlet Bahçeli suggested that Turkey leaving NATO should be considered an option. In May 2022, opposition leader Kemal Kılıçdaroğlu said that if the Justice and Development Party and the Nationalist Movement Party decided to close the Incirlik Air Base to NATO, the Republican People's Party would also support it.

=== United Kingdom ===
The established consensus of the United Kingdom's defence and foreign policy framework includes full membership and participation of NATO. Membership is supported by both major parties in the UK (The Conservatives and Labour) and the Liberal Democrats.

Originally out of the UK-wide parties in the House of Commons, only the Green Party of England and Wales was against NATO membership and advocated leaving the alliance. However, this changed during their 2023 spring conference, when a motion was passed changing the party's viewpoint by abandoning its opposition to NATO. This was done in a review of the party's policies on security and defence, in light of the invasion of Ukraine by Russia. However, there are individual Members of Parliament who support the UK withdrawing from NATO, such as Jeremy Corbyn.

In October 2017, the youth wing of Labour, Young Labour, passed a motion at their annual conference which called for Britain to withdraw from NATO, stating it was a tool of American imperialism. They reconfirmed their position on withdrawal during the 2022 invasion of Ukraine by Russia on Twitter. Support for NATO is high in the United Kingdom with a poll in 2017 indicating that 62% of British people have a favourable view of NATO, compared with only 19% having unfavourable view of the Alliance.

The situation with whether an independent Scotland should join NATO if it ever achieves independence, has been fraught within supporters of an independent Scotland. Originally the Scottish National Party was against NATO membership, much of this was due to the party's non-nuclear stance with Scotland hosting the Trident nuclear programme at the Clyde Naval Base. This changed in 2012, when the SNP under the leadership of Alex Salmond changed its manifesto saying that it would support NATO membership and would join NATO if Scotland ever becomes independent, provided the alliance respect Scotland's non-nuclear stance. This led to some senior members of the SNP to leave the party, including John Finnie and Jean Urquhart. During the prelude to the Russian invasion of Ukraine the SNP's defence spokesman Stewart McDonald reconfirmed the SNP's support for NATO.

Other independence parties including the Scottish Socialist Party and the Scottish Greens as well as some in the SNP (mainly on the left) do not support Scotland's membership and would not want to join if Scotland becomes independent.

The Welsh nationalist party Plaid Cymru is completely opposed to NATO membership and supports withdrawal from the alliance if Welsh independence is achieved. Instead the party advocates a defence position of non-alignment similar to that of Ireland. The leader of Plaid Cymru at the time, Leanne Wood criticized her Scottish counterparts in an interview.

Among the parties in Northern Ireland, NATO policy tends to follow along the unionist-nationalist axis using the basis of the UK's membership and Ireland's non-alignment. All the main parties that support Northern Ireland being part of the United Kingdom including the Ulster Unionists and the Democratic Unionist parties, support NATO membership. Meanwhile, the parties that advocate unification of Northern Ireland with the Republic of Ireland, including SDLP and Sinn Féin, support Irish neutrality. Among the non-sectarian parties which are parties are neither unionist nor nationalist; the Alliance Party supports NATO membership, People Before Profit is strongly opposed, while the Green Party is ambiguous in its viewpoint.

Among British non-governmental organisations, both the pacifist Campaign for Nuclear Disarmament and the Stop the War Coalition advocate British withdrawal from the alliance.

=== United States ===
While both major parties support NATO membership, all the major third parties including the Green Party, the Libertarian Party, and the Constitution Party support withdrawing the United States from NATO.

Polling conducted by Pew Research Center in 2017 said that 62% of Americans are favorable to NATO compared to 23% who are not favorable. In terms of voters, over three-quarters of Democrats are favorable with just 48% of Republicans favorable. 47% of those surveyed, a plurality of responses, said NATO does too little globally. In further polling in 2019 on the eve of the 70th anniversary of NATO's founding, 77% of Americans say being a member of NATO is good for the United States.

The National Defense Authorization Act for Fiscal Year 2024, enacted on 22 December 2023, prohibits the President from unilaterally withdrawing from NATO without approval of a two-thirds Senate majority or an act of Congress and further prohibited the use of federal funds to withdraw if neither of those two requirements were met. The bill provision came amidst then-presidential candidate Donald Trump's mixed messages on NATO. However, it is unclear whether the law can legally stop the President from unilaterally withdrawing, because of constitutional authority that the President has regarding foreign policy.

In December 2024, president-elect Donald Trump suggested that he might support withdrawal from NATO in light of perceived low defense spending by America's European allies. This sentiment was later echoed more strongly by his senior advisor, Elon Musk, who expressed that the United States should leave both the United Nations and NATO in March 2025. In 2024 and 2025, the Pew Research Center reported that support for NATO membership had declined among Republican voters in light of the Russian invasion of Ukraine. As of February 2025, 51% of Republican or Republican-leaning voters believe that the United States does not benefit from NATO membership, in contrast to 17% of Democratic or Democratic-leaning voters.

In early April 2026, President Trump called NATO a "paper tiger" and again floated U.S. withdrawal from the alliance in light of NATO countries' refusal to directly participate in the Iran war by aiding in the reopening of the Strait of Hormuz. Countries such as France did not consider this a warranted action for offensive missions. At the 2026 Ankara NATO summit in July however, Trump said that the United States would not withdraw from NATO.

== Former overseas territories and dependencies of NATO member states ==
At the time of the establishment of the North Atlantic Treaty in 1949, many parts of the world were either overseas or dependent territories of countries such as France and the United Kingdom. As such, these regions, which are today independent states such as Algeria and Malta, were then part of NATO. However, the treaty limits involvement to no lower than the Atlantic region of Tropic of Cancer, and thus de facto limits membership to those in North America and Europe as stated in Articles V & VI. This means that once those overseas territories gained independence, those outside that area could not rejoin as full members.

=== Algeria ===
When France joined NATO in 1949, the northern African territory of Algeria was part of Metropolitan France. By virtue of this, Algeria was part of NATO since its inception. In fact, Article VI clearly states that an armed attack on Algeria would be considered an attack on NATO.

When Algeria gained its independence from France in 1962, its membership was ceased and the Article VI clause was no longer applicable. Like many Maghreb and Arab countries, it aligned itself with the Soviet Union thereafter until the end of the Cold War. Since 2000, Algeria has participated in NATO's Mediterranean Dialogue forum and various training with NATO member countries and military cooperation in the defense industry, especially with Germany.

=== Malta ===
At the time of the signing of the North Atlantic Treaty in 1949, the Mediterranean island of Malta was a dependent territory in a form of a self-governing crown colony of the United Kingdom. Dependent territories like Malta had the international memberships of their mother country, so the island was part of NATO. In fact, the headquarters of the Allied Forces Mediterranean was based in the town of Floriana between 1952 and 1965.

When Malta gained independence in 1964, the country did not apply to join NATO, due to the relations between NATO and the prime minister George Borg Olivier at the time, but nevertheless supported the alliance. This changed in 1971, when Labour's Dom Mintoff was elected as prime minister and stated that Malta is neutral in its foreign policy, a position which was later enacted into the country's constitution in 1974. Later the country joined the Non-Aligned Movement in 1979, at the same time when the British Royal Navy left its base in Malta Dockyard.

In 1995, Malta joined the Euro-Atlantic Partnership Council multilateral defence forum and NATO's Partnership for Peace defence program. However, it withdrew its membership from both organisations a year later in 1996 by the newly elected Labour government. Maltese foreign policy changed notably in 2004, with the country joining the European Union and it re-joined the EAPC and PfP programs in 2008, pointing to a change in the island's foreign relations. Over time, Malta has been building its relations with NATO and getting involved in wider projects including the PfP Planning and Review Process and the NATO Science for Peace and Security Programme.

Membership of NATO is not supported by any of the country's political parties including the current governing Labour and the opposition Nationalists. Polling done by the island-nation's Ministry of Foreign Affairs found in February 2022 (before the Russian invasion of Ukraine) that nearly two-thirds support the island's neutral position, and only 6% are against it. NATO's secretary-general Stoltenberg says the alliance fully respects Malta's position of neutrality, and put no pressure for the country to join the alliance.

=== Cyprus ===
Like Malta, Cyprus was a crown colony at the time of the United Kingdom until it gained independence in 1960. As such, Cyprus was also a member of the NATO under the British crown. However, the reason for Cyprus' non-membership is due to the 1974 Cyprus conflict and relations between Greece and Turkey. This reason even extends to Cyprus' non-participation in the Partnership for Peace program and the Euro-Atlantic Partnership Council multilateral defence forum. In May 2022, Cyprus Defence Minister, Charalambos Petrides, confirmed that the country would not apply to NATO despite the Russian invasion of Ukraine.

However, the Sovereign Base Areas of Akrotiri and Dhekelia remain under British control as a British Overseas Territory.

== See also ==
- Enlargement of NATO
- Withdrawal from the European Union
- Withdrawal from the Council of Europe
