= Self-determination initiative =

Political initiative in Switzerland

Initiative populaire fédérale suisse pour l'autodétermination
March 10, 2015
- Swiss law instead of foreign judges (self-determination initiative)
- Voting system: Referendum
- Outcome: Rejected

The Self-determination initiative (Note: French: Initiative populaire fédérale suisse pour l'autodétermination; German: Selbstbestimmungsinitiative), also known as Swiss law first initiative, was a Swiss federal popular initiative that aimed to place Swiss law above international law.

The initiative was put to a popular vote on November 25, 2018, and was rejected by 66.25% of voters.

== Content ==
The Federal Constitution would have been amended as follows (unofficial translation):

Art. 5

1 Law is the basis and limit of state activity. The Federal Constitution is the supreme source of law in the Swiss Confederation.

4 The Confederation and the Cantons shall respect international law. The Federal Constitution takes precedence over international law, subject to the mandatory rules of international law.

Art. 56a Obligations under international law

1 The Confederation and the Cantons shall not enter into any obligations under international law that conflict with the Federal Constitution.

2 In the event of a conflict of obligations, they shall ensure that obligations under international law are brought into line with constitutional provisions, if necessary by denouncing the international treaties concerned.

3 Mandatory rules of international law are reserved.

Art. 190 Applicable law

The Federal Supreme Court and the other authorities are bound to apply federal laws and international treaties whose approval has been subject to a referendum.

Art. 197, c. 121

12. Transitional provisions on Art. 5, paras. 1 and 4 (Principles of state activity governed by law), Art. 56a (Obligations under international law), and Art. 190 (Applicable law)

From the date of their acceptance by the people and the cantons, Art. 5, paragraphs 1 and 4, Art. 56a, and Art. 190 apply to all existing and future provisions of the Federal Constitution and to all existing and future obligations of the Confederation and the cantons under international law.

== Development ==
=== Context ===
When it became clear that the automatic expulsion envisaged by the popular initiative “For the Expulsion of Criminal Foreigners” (adopted in 2010) could not easily be implemented by law, the Swiss People's Party (SVP) first launched the popular initiative “For the effective removal of criminal foreigners” (rejected in 2016). After the Federal Supreme Court pointed out to Parliament that automatism without case-by-case examination is compatible neither with the Federal Constitution nor with the European Convention on Human Rights, the SVP launched the idea of a “self-determination initiative”.

The SVP says it wants to strengthen direct democracy and end the presumed deprivation of the right to vote. Therefore, in the future, the Federal Constitution should take precedence over international law (subject to imperative provisions, such as those against slavery and genocide). In the view of the Federal Court, only international treaties that have been the subject of a referendum (e.g., not the European Convention on Human Rights) are decisive in addition to federal laws (but qualified by the Schubert practice).

=== Signature collection and deposit ===
Signature collection begins on March 10, 2015. The initiative was submitted to the Federal Chancellery on August 12, 2016.

The initiative was successful with 116,428 valid signatures.

== Debates ==
Parliament and the Federal Council recommended rejection of the initiative because of possible legal uncertainty, economic difficulties, and negative foreign policy repercussions if it were approved.

Opponents argue that democracy is not just about letting the majority of the people decide, but also about fundamental principles such as the separation of powers, the rule of law, and the principle of proportionality. These principles are essential if the majority is to impose its point of view without oppressing minorities.

== Results ==
In favor		Against		Blank votes	Null votes	Total	Registered voters	Partici- pation	Cantons in favor		Cantons against	
Votes	%	Votes	%	Blank votes	Null votes	Total	Registered voters	Partici- pation	Whole	Half	Whole	Half
872 803	33,75	1 712 999	66,25					47,7	0	0	20	6

== See also ==
- List of Swiss federal referendums
- Pure Theory of Law
- Politics of Switzerland
- Swiss Federal Constitution
- List of political parties in Switzerland
- Swiss People's Party
