= 1918 Swiss direct federal tax initiative =

1918 Swiss popular initiative on introducing a federal direct tax

Federal popular initiative
Introduction of the Direct Federal Tax
- (Direct federal tax initiative)
- Filed on: July 17, 1917
- Filed by: Social Democratic Party of Switzerland
- Counterproposal: no
- Voting: June 02, 1918
- Participation: 65.4 %

Result: rejected
- By people: no (by 54.1 %)
- By cantons: no (by 13 3/2)

The federal popular initiative "Introduction of the federal direct tax" was a Swiss popular initiative to establish a progressive direct tax. The initiative was rejected by the people and the cantons on June 02, 1918.

The initiative proposed amending the Federal Constitution of Switzerland by adding Article 41^{bis}, which would allow a progressive direct tax on the assets and income of natural and legal persons, except for those below a certain threshold and charitable organizations. One tenth of the revenue was to be allocated to the cantons. It also proposed replacing the provision allowing the Confederation to levy special contributions from the cantons with this direct tax.

== History ==
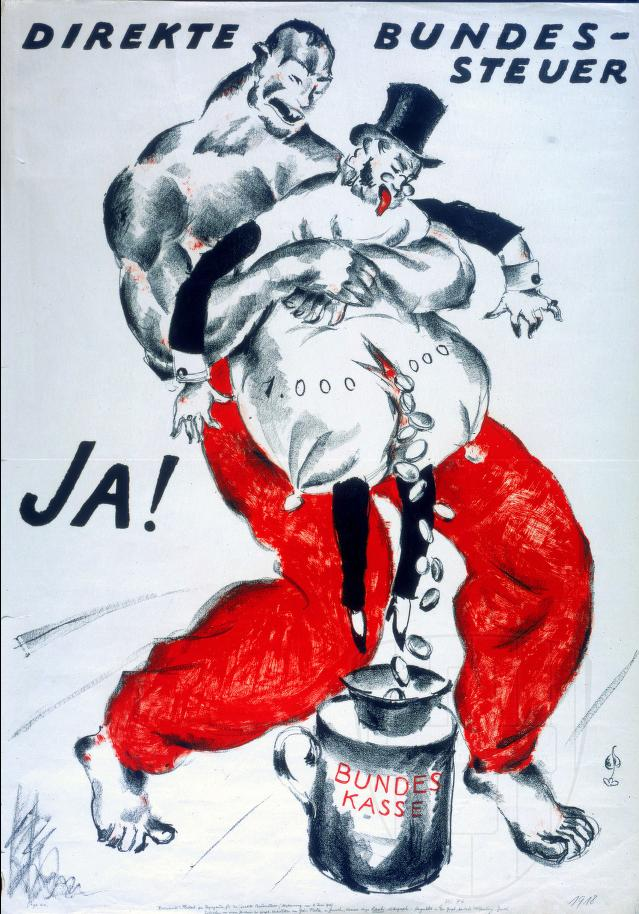
German-language poster in favor of the initiative

=== Historical background ===
After the outbreak of World War I, the federal budget expanded dramatically, rising from less than CHF 100 million in 1913 to nearly two billion francs in cumulative deficits between 1914 and 1919.

The state was therefore forced to raise taxes, especially since customs duties, the main source of revenue at the time, had declined sharply. The most significant of these, the first federal direct tax introduced in 1915, was a «war tax on wealth and the product of labor» that was not distributed equitably, leading to popular discontent.

One of the demands conceded to the Olten Action Committee, which led the general strike of 1918, was the introduction of old-age and disability insurance. The Radical Party, then largely in the majority, refused to separate the issue of introducing the insurance from that of its financing. As a result, the Social Democratic Party launched this initiative to propose financing linked to this direct tax.

=== Signature collection ===
The collection of the required 50.000 signatures by the Social Democratic Party began on November 15, 1916. On July 17, 1917, the initiative was submitted to the Federal Chancellery, which declared it valid on January 25, 1918.

=== Discussions and recommendations ===
The Federal Council and the Federal Assembly both recommended rejecting the initiative.

In its message, the government cited several factors justifying rejection of a federal direct tax, including constitutional issues (as such a tax would encroach on the financial autonomy of the cantons) and financial risks (increasing the likelihood that cantons would lose revenue due to capital flight).

=== Vote ===
Submitted to a vote on June 02, 1918, the initiative was rejected by 13 3/2 cantons and by 54.1% of voters.

== Legacy ==
Following the rejection of this initiative, the Social Democratic Party launched another initiative four years later entitled "Levying a one-time tax on wealth", which met the same fate. A similar rejection also affected the initiative launched by Basel-Stadt politician Christian Rothenberger on the same issue.

Meanwhile, the federal direct tax continued to be levied regularly by the Confederation without becoming permanent. It was successively known as the "new extraordinary war tax", the "crisis tax" during the 1933 economic crisis, and the "national defense tax" from 1941, before taking its current name, "federal direct tax", in 1983. It was renewed by federal executive order until 2020.
