= Popular Initiative "For the Criminal Foreigners' Deportation" =

Swiss popular initiative

For the Criminal Foreigners' Deportation
- (Deportation initiative)

Filed on: February 15, 2008

Filed by: UDC

Counter-project: direct

Voting: November 28, 2010

Participation: 52.6%

Result: accepted

By people: yes (52.9%)

By cantons: yes (15 5/2)

The federal popular initiative "For the Criminal Foreigners' Deportation," also known as the "expulsion initiative," is a Swiss popular initiative that was approved (Note: According to Article 139 of the Constitution, a proposed initiative in the form of a drafted project must be approved by both the majority of the people and the majority of the cantons. In the case of an initiative formulated in general terms, only the vote of the people is required.) on November 28, 2010.

This initiative aimed to amend Article 121 of the Federal Constitution to revoke the residence permits of foreigners convicted of serious offenses or who have fraudulently received social insurance benefits. It also sought to ban them from entering Swiss territory for a period ranging from 5 to 15 years.

== Progress ==
=== Historical context ===
Since 1985, the percentage of foreigners in Swiss prisons has increased. The initiators attribute this trend to increased immigration from distant countries and cultures and a perceived leniency in enforcing penalties (particularly in terms of withdrawal and expulsion). The initiative was proposed to ensure strict adherence to existing laws.

In practice, according to 2007 statistics, the proportion of foreigners involved in the acts explicitly targeted by the initiative is as follows:

- 58.4% in cases of homicide.
- 61.2% in cases of burglary (theft combined with a violation of domicile or property damage).
- 60.8% in cases of robbery (theft with violence).
- 55.8% in serious sexual offenses (rape or sexual coercion).
- 57.7% in drug trafficking.

In 2009, the percentage of foreigners in Swiss prisons was 70.2%. The number of expulsions under current laws varies significantly from region to region due to federalism, which allows cantons some flexibility. For instance, Geneva expelled between 15 and 30 individuals in 2009, while Lucerne expelled 58 people, and Vaud expelled 103 people. The total number of expulsions in 2009 was estimated at 664 people.

=== Signature collection and submission of the initiative ===
The collection of the required 100,000 signatures took place from July 10, 2007, to February 15, 2008. It was submitted to the Federal Chancellery on the same day and confirmed as complete on March 7 of the same year.

=== Discussions and recommendations of the authorities ===
Both the parliament and the Federal Council recommended rejecting this initiative. The Federal Council, in its recommendation, proposed an indirect counterproposal in the form of an amendment to the Federal Law on Foreigners. It stated that, in its opinion, the initiative "does not violate essential rules of public international law" but could result in "significant conflicts," especially regarding privacy protection and adherence to non-essential public international law.

During the parliamentary debate, deputies decided to amend the Federal Council's proposal by introducing a direct counterproposal. This counterproposal suggests determining the withdrawal of a criminal foreigner's residence permit based on an evaluation of the specific case's severity rather than a predefined list of offenses. It also includes provisions for the integration of the foreign population.

The voting recommendations of the political parties are as follows:

Political party	Recommendation
Ticino League	yes
Conservative Democratic Party	no
Christian Social Party	no
Christian Democratic People's Party	no
Social Democratic Party	no
Green Liberal Party	no
The Liberals	no
Swiss People's Party	yes
Federal Democratic Union of Switzerland	yes
Green Party of Switzerland	no

=== Voting ===
The initiative was put to a vote on November 28, 2010, and was accepted by 15.5/2 cantons (Note: The first number indicates the total number of cantons, and the second number indicates the number of cantons counted as half. For example, 20 6/2 means "20 cantons with 6 cantons counted as half.") and 52.9% of the votes cast. The chart below details the results by canton:

Popular Initiative
Canton	Approval rate
ZH	50.9
BE	48.7
LU	51.5
UR	53.3
SZ	42.4
OW	43.9
NW	41.9
GL	65.7
ZG	56.4
FR	51.7
SO	42.5
BS	50.1
BL	56.3
SH	46
AR	71.7
AI	40.4
SG	49.7
GR	42.4
AG	39.7
TG	38.3
TI	54.1
VD	67.9
VS	69.8
NE	63.9
GE	60.9

On the other hand, the government's counterproposal was rejected by all 20.6/2 cantons and 54.2% of the votes cast. The chart below details the results by canton for this counterproposal:

Popular Initiative Results
Canton	Results
ZH	46.9
BE	46.3
LU	46.9
UR	39.7
SZ	39.1
OW	43
NW	41.4
GL	41.4
ZG	49.3
FR	47.5
SO	44.9
BS	47.7
BL	48.2
SH	44.8
AR	46.2
AI	39.2
SG	44.2
GR	44.3
AG	47.1
TG	44.2
TI	44.7
VD	42.5
VS	48.2
NE	46.8
GE	43.3
JU	45.5

=== Results map ===
The initiative received strong support from the central cantons but was rejected by the French-speaking cantons, except for Valais, and Basel-City.

=== Incidents ===
- In Allschwil (Basel-Landschaft), masked unknown individuals took away a ballot box and set fire to its contents outside the polling station.
- In Schlieren (Zürich), police thwarted an attempted arson attack at a polling station.

== Reactions to the Popular Initiative ==
=== In Switzerland ===
During the night from Sunday to Monday, protests took place in several Swiss cities, including Lausanne, Bern, and Zürich. Incidents and vandalism occurred in Zürich, notably against the UDC headquarters. In Geneva, unknown persons replaced press posters of the Geneva Tribune with the slogan "The criminal is the voter."

The Swiss press notes the powerlessness of left-wing and center-right parties against the UDC. Le Temps estimates that "the population, particularly those who feel weak and troubled by identity issues, wants to be reassured by concrete actions."

=== Abroad ===
The international press overwhelmingly condemns the Swiss vote.

In France, Libération criticizes a vote "supported by an abundance of openly xenophobic posters." Piotr Moszynski from Radio France Internationale questions the boundaries of democracy and suggests that "Swiss democracy stumbles over foreigners." Le Point finds the outcome "unsurprising." Philippe Bilger, writing for Marianne, reflects that "the Swiss may be correct, but we are uncertain if we should be proud of this belief." On RTL, Éric Zemmour suggests that the Swiss voted on behalf of the rest of Europe.

According to an observer in Brussels, the European Union considers Switzerland to be an unreliable partner due to the possibility of Swiss votes conflicting with international and bilateral agreements. EU representatives have expressed concerns that excessive democracy in Switzerland could lead to the population prioritizing their interests.

SOS Racisme has issued a statement expressing indignation over the Swiss vote, condemning Switzerland for perpetuating a hateful image by blaming societal issues on the "Other." This statement has been criticized by Ivan Rioufol, who argues that moralizers supporting rebellious minorities are contributing to the dismantling of nations.

== Application ==
In November 2014, the Council of States Commission revisited the compromise reached by the National Council, adding a strict clause that allows judges to waive expulsion. This provision, granting judges additional discretion, had been explicitly rejected by the public in response to the Council of States' initiative. The UDC responded by accusing the government of disregarding the will of the people.

== See also ==
- List of Swiss federal referendums
