= London and Paris Conferences =

Conferences about West Germany

The London and Paris Conferences were two related conferences held in London and Paris during September–October 1954 to determine the status of West Germany. The talks concluded with the signing of the Paris Agreements (Paris Pacts, or Paris Accords), which granted West Germany some sovereignty, ended the occupation, and allowed its admittance to NATO. Furthermore, both West Germany and Italy joined the Brussels Treaty on 23 October 1954. The Agreements went into force on 5 May 1955. The participating powers included France, the United Kingdom, Belgium, the Netherlands, Luxembourg, West Germany, Italy, Canada, the United States, and remaining NATO members.

== Prelude ==
Since the end of World War II, West Germany had been occupied by Allied forces and lacked its own means of defense. On 23 July 1952, the European Coal and Steel Community came into existence, bonding the member states economically. By 1951, fear of possible Soviet aggression in Europe led to preparation of an ill-fated European Defense Community (EDC). EDC was a proposed joint Western European military force, at the time favored over admitting Germany to NATO. The General Treaty (German: Deutschlandvertrag) of 1952 formally named the EDC as a prerequisite of the end of Allied occupation of Germany. EDC was, however, rejected by the French National Assembly on August 30, 1954, and a new solution became necessary.

== London ==
At the London Conference, often called the Nine-Power Conference (not to be confused with the Nine Power Treaty), it was agreed that the occupying powers would make every effort to end the occupation. The limits of German re-armament were also very important especially to France, which was still concerned with a powerful Germany.

Belgium was represented by Paul-Henri Spaak, Canada by Lester B. Pearson, France by Pierre Mendès-France, Germany by Konrad Adenauer, Italy by Gaetano Martino, Luxembourg by Joseph Bech, the Netherlands by Jan Willem Beyen, the United Kingdom by Anthony Eden, and the United States by John Foster Dulles.

== Paris ==
The powers met again in Paris on October 20–23, in an intergovernmental conference followed by a NATO Council meeting, to put the decisions reached in London into formal declarations and protocols to existing treaties. "Protocol No. I Modifying and Completing the Brussels Treaty" formally added West Germany and Italy to the Brussels Treaty, creating the Western European Union (WEU), which, while not as broad or powerful as the previously proposed EDC, nevertheless was sufficient for the Deutschlandvertrag to come into force and therefore to end the occupation of West Germany and admit it as an ally in the Cold War.

Altogether there were as many as twelve international agreements signed in Paris. Protocol No. II committed the United Kingdom to maintain four divisions and the Second Tactical Air Force in Europe.

The Bonn–Paris conventions ended the occupation of West Germany and West Germany obtained "the full authority of a sovereign state" on 5 May 1955 (although "full sovereignty" was not obtained until the Two Plus Four Agreement in 1990). (Note: Detlef Junker of the Ruprecht-Karls-Universität Heidelberg states "In the October 23, 1954, Paris Agreements, Adenauer pushed through the following laconic wording: 'The Federal Republic shall accordingly [after termination of the occupation regime] have the full authority of a sovereign state over its internal and external affairs.' If this was intended as a statement of fact, it must be conceded that it was partly fiction and, if interpreted as wishful thinking, it was a promise that went unfulfilled until 1990. The Allies maintained their rights and responsibilities regarding Berlin and Germany as a whole, particularly the responsibility for future reunification and a future peace treaty".) The treaty allowed Allied troops to remain in the country.

An agreement expanded the Brussels Treaty of 1948 to include West Germany and Italy, creating the Western European Union. This agreement allowed West Germany to start a limited rearmament program though it banned development of certain weapons, such as large warships. It was signed by the Brussels Treaty countries (Belgium, France, Great Britain, Luxembourg, and the Netherlands) and by West Germany and Italy.

Another accord accepted West Germany into the North Atlantic Treaty Organization (NATO).

=== Saar status ===
The negotiations on Saar status, only between France and West Germany, were held on the night before the conference, on 19 October. The territory had been essentially annexed by France after the war as a "protectorate" in an economic, customs and monetary union with France and with a government subordinate to a High Commissioner appointed by the French government. West Germany was keen to prevent further integration of the Saar with France and reincorporate the region into West Germany. France and West Germany negotiated an agreement under which the Saar would become a "European territory" and remain economically tied to France, but required a referendum of Saar residents on the new proposal. The 1955 Saar Statute referendum took place on October 23, 1955 and residents rejected the Paris Agreement proposal by 2-1. This was taken as a sign that residents preferred reunion with Germany. On 27 October 1956 the Saar Treaty officially made Saarland a state of the Federal Republic of Germany.

== See also ==
- Berlin Conference (1954) and 1954 Geneva Conference, parallel conferences for peace in Korea and Indochina|

== EU evolution timeline ==
Since the end of World War II, most sovereign European countries have entered into treaties and thereby co-operated and harmonised policies (or pooled sovereignty) in an increasing number of areas, in the European integration project or the construction of Europe (French: la construction européenne). The following timeline outlines the legal inception of the European Union (EU)—the principal framework for this unification. The EU inherited many of its present organisations, institutions, and responsibilities from the European Communities (EC), which were founded in the 1950s in the spirit of the Schuman Declaration.

Legend:
S: signing
F: entry into force
T: termination
E: expiry
de facto supersession
Rel. w/ EC/EU framework:
de facto inside
outside

European Union (EU)
[Cont.]
European Communities (EC)
(Pillar I)

European Atomic Energy Community (EAEC or EURATOM)

[Cont.]

/ / / European Coal and Steel Community (ECSC)

(Distr. of competences)

European Economic Community (EEC)

Schengen Rules
European Community (EC)
TREVI
Justice and Home Affairs (JHA, pillar III)

/ North Atlantic Treaty Organisation (NATO)
[Cont.]
Police and Judicial Co-operation in Criminal Matters (PJCC, pillar III)

Anglo-French alliance
[Defence arm handed to NATO]
European Political Co-operation (EPC)

Common Foreign and Security Policy
(CFSP, pillar II)
Western Union (WU)
/ Western European Union (WEU)
[Tasks defined following the WEU's 1984 reactivation handed to the EU]

[Social, cultural tasks handed to CoE]
[Cont.]

Council of Europe (CoE)
Entente Cordiale
S: 8 April 1904
Dunkirk Treaty (Note: Although not EU treaties per se, these treaties affected the development of the EU defence arm, a main part of the CFSP. The Franco-British alliance established by the Dunkirk Treaty was de facto superseded by WU. The CFSP pillar was bolstered by some of the security structures that had been established within the remit of the 1955 Modified Brussels Treaty (MBT). The Brussels Treaty was terminated in 2011, consequently dissolving the WEU, as the mutual defence clause that the Lisbon Treaty provided for EU was considered to render the WEU superfluous. The EU thus de facto superseded the WEU.)
S: 4 March 1947
F: 8 September 1947
E: 8 September 1997
Brussels Treaty
S: 17 March 1948
F: 25 August 1948
T: 30 June 2011
London and Washington treaties
S: 5 May/4 April 1949
F: 3 August/24 August 1949
Paris treaties: ECSC and EDC (Note: Plans to establish a European Political Community (EPC) were shelved following the French failure to ratify the Treaty establishing the European Defence Community (EDC). The EPC would have combined the ECSC and the EDC.)
S: 18 April 1951/27 May 1952
F: 23 July 1952/?
E: 23 July 2002/—
Protocol Modifying and
Completing the Brussels Treaty
S: 23 October 1954
F: 6 May 1955
Rome treaties: EEC and EAEC
S: 25 March 1957
F: 1 January 1958
WEU-CoE agreement
S: 21 October 1959
F: 1 January 1960
Brussels (Merger) Treaty (Note: The European Communities obtained common institutions and a shared legal personality (i.e. ability to e.g. sign treaties in their own right).)
S: 8 April 1965
F: 1 July 1967
Davignon report
S: 27 October 1970
European Council conclusions
S: 2 December 1975
Single European Act (SEA)
S: 17/28 February 1986
F: 1 July 1987
Schengen Agreement and Convention
S: 14 June 1985/19 June 1990
F: 26 March 1995
Maastricht Treaty (Note: The treaties of Maastricht and Rome form the EU's legal basis, and are also referred to as the Treaty on European Union (TEU) and the Treaty on the Functioning of the European Union (TFEU), respectively. They are amended by secondary treaties.) (Note: Between the EU's founding in 1993 and consolidation in 2009, the union consisted of three pillars, the first of which were the European Communities. The other two pillars consisted of additional areas of cooperation that had been added to the EU's remit.)
S: 7 February 1992
F: 1 November 1993
Amsterdam Treaty
S: 2 October 1997
F: 1 May 1999
Nice Treaty
S: 26 February 2001
F: 1 February 2003
Lisbon Treaty (Note: The consolidation meant that the EU inherited the European Communities' legal personality and that the pillar system was abolished, resulting in the EU framework as such covering all policy areas. Executive/legislative power in each area was instead determined by a distribution of competencies between EU institutions and member states. This distribution, as well as treaty provisions for policy areas in which unanimity is required and qualified majority voting is possible, reflects the depth of EU integration as well as the EU's partly supranational and partly intergovernmental nature.)
S: 13 December 2007
F: 1 December 2009
