= Western Union (alliance) =

1948–1954 European military alliance

- 1948–1954
- Flag Badge

- Status: Alliance
- Capital: Fontainebleau, France; London, United Kingdom
- Historical era: Cold War
  - Czechoslovak coup: 21–25 February 1948
  - Treaty of Brussels: 17 March 1948
  - WUDO established: 28 September 1948
  - Korean War breaks out: 25 June 1950
  - NATO absorbs WUDO: 1951
  - Superseded by the WEU by the Modified Treaty of Brussels: 23 October 1954
Preceded by	Succeeded by
Treaty of Dunkirk	Western European Union
- Today part of: EU (CSDP); NATO; Council of Europe

The Western Union (WU), also referred to as the Brussels Treaty Organisation (BTO), was the European military alliance established between France, the United Kingdom (UK) and the three Benelux countries (Belgium, the Netherlands, Luxembourg) in September 1948 in order to implement the Treaty of Brussels signed in March the same year. (Note: Although the Treaty goes no further than providing for 'cooperation' between the contracting parties, 'which will be effected through the Consultative Council referred to in Article VII as well as through other bodies', in practice the arrangement was referred to as Western Union or the Brussels Treaty Organisation.) Under this treaty, the signatories, referred to as the five powers, agreed to collaborate on defence as well as in political, economic and cultural fields.

During the Korean War (1950–1953), the headquarters, personnel and plans of the WU's defence arm, the Western Union Defence Organisation (WUDO), were transferred to the newly-established North Atlantic Treaty Organization (NATO), providing the nucleus of the European half of NATO's command structure (Allied Command Europe), led by Supreme Headquarters Allied Powers Europe (SHAPE). As a consequence of the failure of the European Defence Community in 1954, the London and Paris Conferences led to the Modified Treaty of Brussels (MTB), through which the Western Union was transformed into the Western European Union (WEU) and was joined by Italy and West Germany. As the WEU's functions were transferred to the European Union's (EU) European Security and Defence Policy (ESDP) at the turn of the 21st century, the Western Union is a precursor of both NATO and the military arm of the EU.

== History ==
=== Background ===
In the aftermath of World War II, fears of renewed German aggression emerged. On 4 March 1947, the Treaty of Dunkirk was signed by France and the United Kingdom as a Treaty of Alliance and Mutual Assistance in the event of a possible attack.

In his speech to the House of Commons on 22 January 1948, British Foreign Secretary Ernest Bevin called for the extension of the Treaty of Dunkirk to also include the Benelux countries, creating a Western Union. The object was to consolidate Western Europe to satisfy the United States and to give advance notice of the eventual incorporation of Italy, and then West Germany, into the Treaty.

The negotiating conference was held on 4 March 1948, a few days after the coup in Prague; thanks to this, the three smaller countries were able to persuade the others to agree to the concept of automatic and immediate mutual assistance in the event of aggression, and to the idea of setting up a regional organization (a multilateral alliance in accordance with Article 51 of the Charter of the United Nations).

The Western Union was intended to provide Western Europe with a bulwark against the communist threat and to bring greater collective security.

=== Formation ===
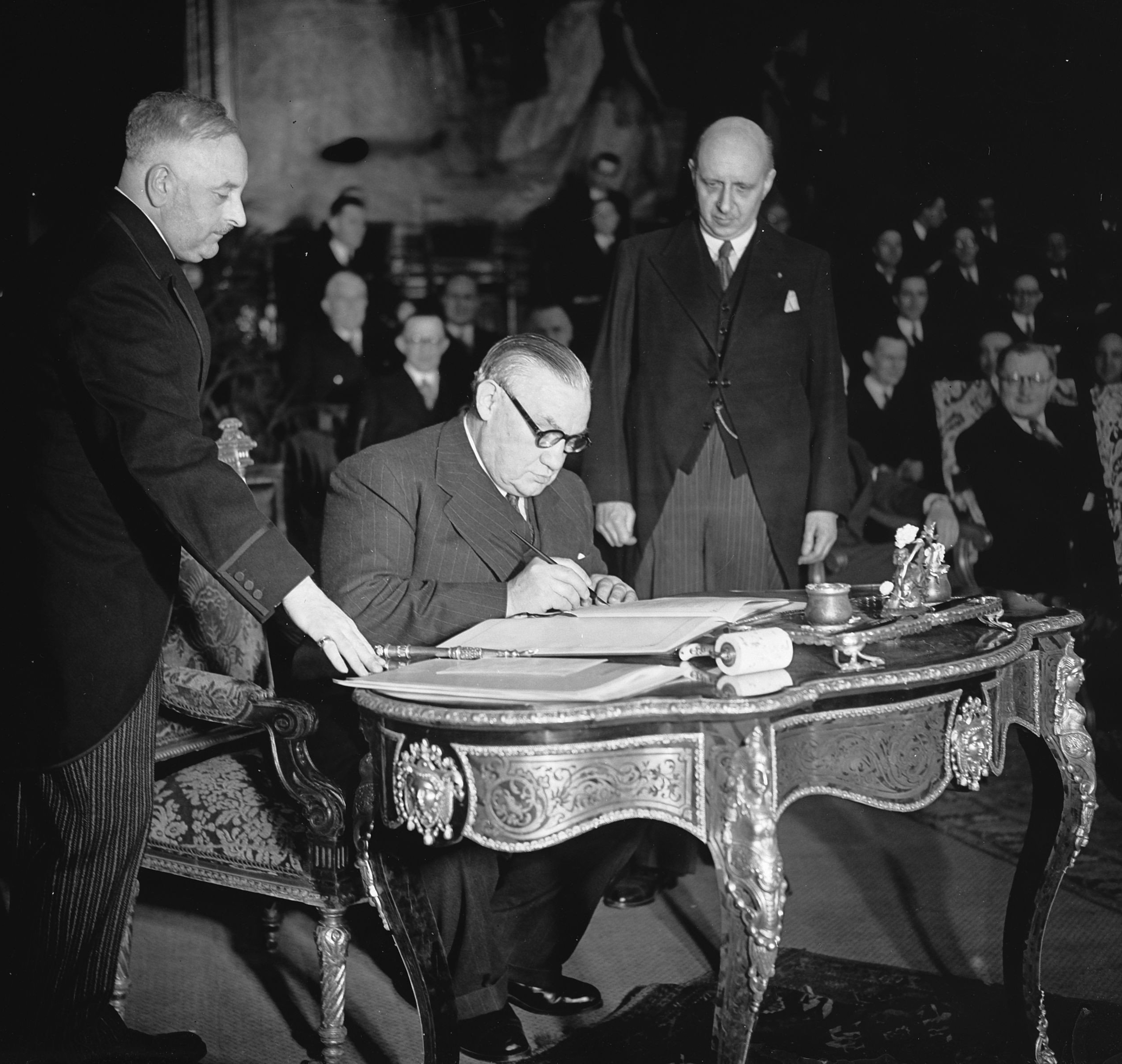
British Foreign Secretary Ernest Bevin signing the Treaty of Brussels

The Treaty of Brussels was signed on 17 March 1948 between Belgium, France, Luxembourg, the Netherlands and the United Kingdom, and was an expansion to the preceding year's defence pledge, the Dunkirk Treaty signed between the United Kingdom and France.

Although the Treaty goes no further than providing for 'cooperation' between the contracting parties, 'which will be effected through the Consultative Council referred to in Article VII as well as through other bodies', in practice the arrangement was referred to as Western Union or the Brussels Treaty Organisation.

=== Cannibalisation and marginalisation ===
As rising communist sympathies in Western Europe and their repression by Western states made a division of Europe into two opposing camps unavoidable, Western Europe sought a new mutual defence pact involving the United States, a powerful military force for such an alliance. Concerned with containing Soviet influence, the United States responded. Secret meetings began by the end of March 1949 between American, Canadian and British officials to initiate the negotiations that led to the signing of the North Atlantic Treaty on 4 April 1949 in Washington, D.C.

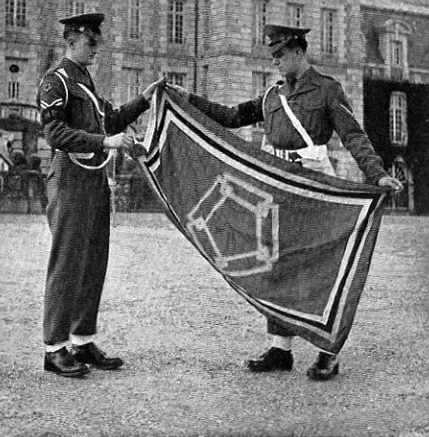
NCOs of the Corps of the Royal Military Police displaying the Western Union Standard outside Château de Courances on 1 October 1949

The need to back up the commitments of the North Atlantic Treaty with appropriate political and military structures led to the creation of the North Atlantic Treaty Organisation (NATO). On 20 December 1950, the Consultative Council of the Brussels Treaty Powers decided to merge the Western Union's military organisation into NATO. In December 1950, with the appointment of General Eisenhower as the first Supreme Allied Commander Europe (SACEUR), the members of the Treaty of Brussels decided to transfer the headquarters, personnel, and plans of the Western Union Defence Organisation (WUDO) to NATO. NATO's Supreme Headquarters Allied Powers Europe (SHAPE) took over responsibility for the defence of Western Europe, while the physical headquarters in Fontainebleau were transformed into NATO's Headquarters, Allied Forces Central Europe (AFCENT). Field Marshal Bernard Montgomery resigned as Chairman of WUDO's Land, Naval and Air Commanders-in-Chief Committee on 31 March 1951 and took the position of Deputy Supreme Allied Commander Europe (DSACEUR) on 1 April 1951.

The establishment of NATO, along with the signing of a succession of treaties establishing the Organisation for European Economic Cooperation (April 1948), the North Atlantic Treaty Organisation (April 1949), the Council of Europe (May 1949) and the European Coal and Steel Community (April 1951), left the Western Union and its founding Treaty of Brussels devoid of much of its authority.

=== Transformation into the Western European Union ===
The Western Union's founding Treaty of Brussels was amended at the 1954 Paris Conference. This was required because the Treaty establishing the European Defence Community (EDC) had not been ratified by France, and the General Treaty (German: Deutschlandvertrag) of 1952 had specified that Germany's joining the EDC would be a condition precedent to Allied withdrawal from post-war occupation thereof — there was a desire, nonetheless, to effectively include West Germany in whatever Western defence architecture was created. The Modified Brussels Treaty (MBT) thus transformed the Western Union into the Western European Union (WEU), at which point Italy and Germany were admitted. Although the WEU was significantly less powerful and ambitious than the original Western Union, German membership in the WEU was considered sufficient for the occupation of the country to end in accordance with the General Treaty.

Social and cultural aspects were handed to the Council of Europe to avoid duplication of responsibilities within Europe.

Since the end of World War II, most sovereign European countries have entered into treaties and thereby co-operated and harmonised policies (or pooled sovereignty) in an increasing number of areas, in the European integration project or the construction of Europe (French: la construction européenne). The following timeline outlines the legal inception of the European Union (EU) — the principal framework for this unification. The EU inherited many of its present organisations, institutions and responsibilities from the European Communities (EC), which were founded in the 1950s in the spirit of the Schuman Declaration.

Legend:
S: signing
F: entry into force
T: termination
E: expiry
de facto supersession
Rel. w/ EC/EU framework:
de facto inside
outside

European Union (EU)
[Cont.]
European Communities (EC)
(Pillar I)

European Atomic Energy Community (EAEC or EURATOM)

[Cont.]

/ / / European Coal and Steel Community (ECSC)

(Distr. of competences)

European Economic Community (EEC)

Schengen Rules
European Community (EC)
TREVI
Justice and Home Affairs (JHA, pillar III)

/ North Atlantic Treaty Organisation (NATO)
[Cont.]
Police and Judicial Co-operation in Criminal Matters (PJCC, pillar III)

Anglo-French alliance
[Defence arm handed to NATO]
European Political Co-operation (EPC)

Common Foreign and Security Policy
(CFSP, pillar II)
Western Union (WU)
/ Western European Union (WEU)
[Tasks defined following the WEU's 1984 reactivation handed to the EU]

[Social, cultural tasks handed to CoE]
[Cont.]

Council of Europe (CoE)
Entente Cordiale
S: 8 April 1904
Dunkirk Treaty (Note: Although not EU treaties per se, these treaties affected the development of the EU defence arm, a main part of the CFSP. The Franco-British alliance established by the Dunkirk Treaty was de facto superseded by WU. The CFSP pillar was bolstered by some of the security structures that had been established within the remit of the 1955 Modified Brussels Treaty (MBT). The Brussels Treaty was terminated in 2011, consequently dissolving the WEU, as the mutual defence clause that the Lisbon Treaty provided for EU was considered to render the WEU superfluous. The EU thus de facto superseded the WEU.)
S: 4 March 1947
F: 8 September 1947
E: 8 September 1997
Brussels Treaty
S: 17 March 1948
F: 25 August 1948
T: 30 June 2011
London and Washington treaties
S: 5 May/4 April 1949
F: 3 August/24 August 1949
Paris treaties: ECSC and EDC (Note: Plans to establish a European Political Community (EPC) were shelved following the French failure to ratify the Treaty establishing the European Defence Community (EDC). The EPC would have combined the ECSC and the EDC.)
S: 18 April 1951/27 May 1952
F: 23 July 1952/?
E: 23 July 2002/—
Protocol Modifying and
Completing the Brussels Treaty
S: 23 October 1954
F: 6 May 1955
Rome treaties: EEC and EAEC
S: 25 March 1957
F: 1 January 1958
WEU-CoE agreement
S: 21 October 1959
F: 1 January 1960
Brussels (Merger) Treaty (Note: The European Communities obtained common institutions and a shared legal personality (i.e. ability to e.g. sign treaties in their own right).)
S: 8 April 1965
F: 1 July 1967
Davignon report
S: 27 October 1970
European Council conclusions
S: 2 December 1975
Single European Act (SEA)
S: 17/28 February 1986
F: 1 July 1987
Schengen Agreement and Convention
S: 14 June 1985/19 June 1990
F: 26 March 1995
Maastricht Treaty (Note: The treaties of Maastricht and Rome form the EU's legal basis, and are also referred to as the Treaty on European Union (TEU) and the Treaty on the Functioning of the European Union (TFEU), respectively. They are amended by secondary treaties.) (Note: Between the EU's founding in 1993 and consolidation in 2009, the union consisted of three pillars, the first of which were the European Communities. The other two pillars consisted of additional areas of cooperation that had been added to the EU's remit.)
S: 7 February 1992
F: 1 November 1993
Amsterdam Treaty
S: 2 October 1997
F: 1 May 1999
Nice Treaty
S: 26 February 2001
F: 1 February 2003
Lisbon Treaty (Note: The consolidation meant that the EU inherited the European Communities' legal personality and that the pillar system was abolished, resulting in the EU framework as such covering all policy areas. Executive/legislative power in each area was instead determined by a distribution of competencies between EU institutions and member states. This distribution, as well as treaty provisions for policy areas in which unanimity is required and qualified majority voting is possible, reflects the depth of EU integration as well as the EU's partly supranational and partly intergovernmental nature.)
S: 13 December 2007
F: 1 December 2009

== Social and cultural initiatives ==
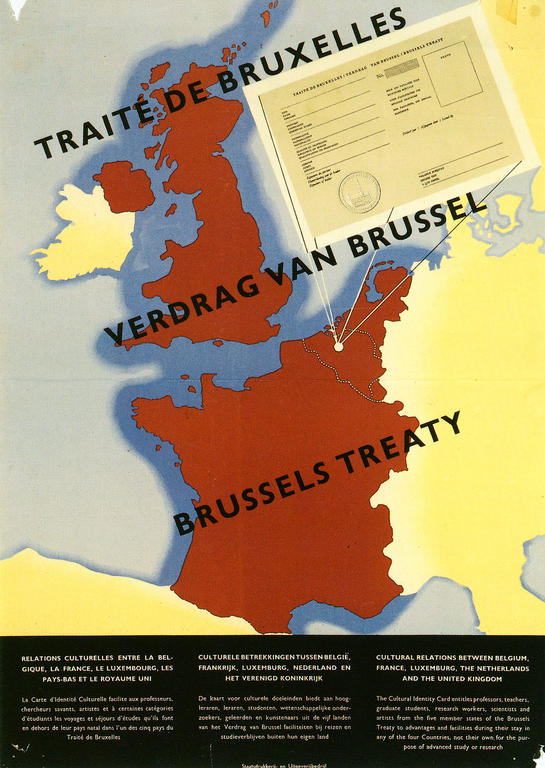
Poster on the Western Union Cultural Identity Card

The Treaty of Brussels included cultural and social clauses, including the creation of a 'Consultative Council'. This was based on the idea that cooperation between Western nations would help stop the spread of Communism.

Examples of this cooperation include

- the Cultural Identity Card, which the WU instituted to give mutual facilities to each member state for cultural purposes. It could be issued to students, teachers and researchers. It carried an embossed stamp representing the Brussels Town Hall. The WU card was superseded by the Council of Europe cultural identity Card.
- the 1951 Western Union International Guide for Young People

== Defence Organisation ==
From April 1948, the member states of the Western Union decided to create a military agency called the Western Union Defence Organisation (WUDO). WUDO was formally established on September 27–28, 1948.

The objective of WUDO was to provide for the coordination of defence between the five powers in the military and supply fields and for the study of the tactical problems of the defence of Western Europe; in addition, to provide a framework on which, in the event of any emergency, a command organisation could be built up.

The Treaty of Brussels contained a mutual defence clause as set forth in Article IV:

If any of the High Contracting Parties should be the object of an armed attack in Europe, the other High Contracting Parties will, in accordance with the provisions of Article 51 of the Charter of the United Nations, afford the Party so attacked all the military and other aid and assistance in their power.

Article V set forth Brussels Pact members' obligations to cooperate with the United Nations Security Council to maintain international peace and security, and Article VI set forth their obligation not to enter any third-party treaties that conflicted with the Treaty of Brussels.

== See also ==
- Treaty establishing the European Defence Community
- Western European Union
- European Union
  - Treaty of Brussels
  - Common Security and Defence Policy
    - History of the Common Security and Defence Policy
- North Atlantic Treaty Organization
  - History of NATO
  - Supreme Headquarters Allied Powers Europe
    - Supreme Allied Commander Europe

== Notes ==
Footnotes

Citations
