= European Communities =

Former international organizations governed by same set of institutions

Pillars of the European Union
- The three pillars which constituted the European Union (clickable)
- 1993–2009 → EU

Constituent communities
- European Coal and Steel Community: 1952–2002
- European Economic Community/European Community: 1958–1993/1993–2009
- European Atomic Energy Community: 1958–present

The European Communities (EC) were three international organisations that were governed by the same set of institutions. These were the European Coal and Steel Community (ECSC), the European Atomic Energy Community (EAEC or Euratom), and the European Economic Community (EEC), the last of which was renamed the European Community (EC) in 1993 by the Maastricht Treaty establishing the European Union. The European Union was established at that time more as a concept rather than an entity, while the Communities remained the actual subjects of international law impersonating the rather abstract Union, becoming at the same time its first pillar. In popular language, however, the singular European Community was sometimes used interchangeably with the plural phrase, in the sense of referring to all three entities.

The European Coal and Steel Community ceased to exist in 2002 when its founding treaty expired. The European Community was merged with the second and third EU pillars by the Treaty of Lisbon in 2009, finally allowing the European Union to move beyond being only a concept and to assume the shape of a legally incorporated international organisation with juridical personality, designated as the legal successor to the Community. However, the reformed EU has not become entirely unified, because Euratom, though governed with the EU by the common set of institutions, has been retained as an entity distinct from the EU, along with a number of other international entities, such as the European Investment Bank, the European University Institute, the European Stability Mechanism, and the Unified Patent Court.

== History ==
=== Three communities ===
The ECSC was created first. Following its proposal in 1950 in the Schuman Declaration, Belgium, France, Italy, Luxembourg, the Netherlands, and West Germany came together to sign the Treaty of Paris in 1951 which established the Community. The success of this Community led to the desire to create more, but attempts at creating a European Defence Community and a European Political Community failed leading to a return to economic matters. In 1957, the EAEC and EEC were created by the Treaties of Rome. They were to share some of the institutions of the un ECSC but have separate executive structures. The ECSC's aim was to combine the coal and steel industries of its members to create a single market in those resources. It was intended that this would increase prosperity and decrease the risk of these countries going to war through the process of European integration. The EAEC was working on nuclear energy co-operation between the members. The EEC was to create a customs union and general economic co-operation. It later led to the creation of a European single market.

The EEC became the European Community pillar of the EU, with the ECSC and EAEC continuing in a similar subordinate position, existing separately in a legal sense but governed by the institutions of the EU as if they were its own. The ECSC's treaty had a 50-year limit and thus expired in 2002; all its activities are now absorbed into the European Community. The EAEC had no such limit and thus continues to exist. Given that nuclear power is a very sensitive issue for the European electorate, the Euratom Treaty has gone without amendment since its signing, and was not even to be changed with the European Constitution intended to repeal all other treaties (the Constitution's replacement, the Treaty of Lisbon, likewise makes no attempt at amendment).

As the EAEC has a low profile, and the profile of the European Community is dwarfed by that of the EU, the term "European Communities" sees little usage. However, when the EU was established the institutions that dealt solely or mainly with the European Community (as opposed to all three pillars) retained their original names, for example the formal name of the European Court of Justice was the "Court of Justice of the European Communities" until 2009.

In 1967, the Merger Treaty combined these separate executives. The Commission and Council of the EEC were to take over the responsibilities of its counterparts in the other organisations. From then on they became known collectively as the "European Communities", for example the commission was known as the "Commission of the European Communities", although the communities themselves remained separate in legal terms.

=== Structural evolution of the European Commission ===
Signed
In force
Document
1951
1952
Paris Treaty
1957
1958
Rome treaties: EEC Treaty Euratom Treaty
1965
1967
Merger Treaty
2007
2009
Lisbon Treaty

Commission of the European Atomic Energy Community
Commission of the European Communities
European Commission

High Authority of the European Coal and Steel Community

Commission of the European Economic Community

=== Pillar ===
The Maastricht Treaty built upon the Single European Act and the Solemn Declaration on European Union in the creation of the European Union. The treaty was signed on 7 February 1992 and came into force on 1 November 1993. The emerging Union integrated the European Communities as its institutional core and one of its three pillars. The first Commission President following the creation of the EU was Jacques Delors, who briefly continued his previous EEC tenure before handing over to Jacques Santer in 1994.

The first pillar was the only one established according to then-innovative principles of supranationalism. The pillar structure of the EU allowed the areas of European co-operation to be increased without leaders handing a large amount of power to supranational institutions. The pillar system segregated the EU. What were formerly the competencies of the EEC fell within the European Communities pillar. Justice and Home Affairs was introduced as a new pillar while European Political Cooperation became the second pillar (the Common Foreign and Security Policy).

The Communities institutions became the institutions of the EU but the roles of the institutions between the pillars are different. The commission, Parliament and Court of Justice are largely cut out of activities in the second and third pillars, with the Council dominating proceedings. This is reflected in the names of the institutions: the council is formally the "Council of the European Union" while the commission is formally the "Commission of the European Communities". This allowed the new areas to be based on intergovernmentalism (unanimous agreement between governments) rather than majority voting and independent institutions according to supranational democracy.

However, after the Treaty of Maastricht, Parliament gained a much bigger role. Maastricht brought in the codecision procedure, which gave it equal legislative power with the Council on Community matters. Hence, with the greater powers of the supranational institutions and the operation of Qualified Majority Voting in the council, the Communities pillar could be described as a far more federal method of decision making.

The Amsterdam Treaty transferred rule making powers for border controls, immigration, asylum and cooperation in civil and commercial law from the Justice and Home Affairs (JHA) pillar to the European Community (JHA was renamed Police and Judicial Co-operation in Criminal Matters (PJCC) as a result). Both Amsterdam and the Treaty of Nice also extended codecision procedure to nearly all policy areas, giving Parliament equal power to the Council in the Community.

In 2002, the Treaty of Paris which established the European Coal and Steel Community (one of the three communities which comprised the European Communities) expired, having reached its 50-year limit (as the first treaty, it was the only one with a limit). No attempt was made to renew its mandate; instead, the Treaty of Nice transferred certain of its elements to the Treaty of Rome and hence its work continued as part of the EC area of the Communities remit.

The Treaty of Lisbon merged the three pillars and abolished the European Community, with the European Union becoming the Community's legal successor. Only one of the three European Communities still exists, thus making the designation of "European Communities" obsolete.

The abolition of the pillar structure was proposed already under the European Constitution which ultimately failed to pass the ratification process.

== EU evolution timeline ==
Since the end of World War II, most sovereign European countries have entered into treaties and thereby co-operated and harmonised policies (or pooled sovereignty) in an increasing number of areas, in the European integration project or the construction of Europe (French: la construction européenne). The following timeline outlines the legal inception of the European Union (EU) — the principal framework for this unification. The EU inherited many of its present organisations, institutions and responsibilities from the European Communities (EC), which were founded in the 1950s in the spirit of the Schuman Declaration.

Legend:
S: signing
F: entry into force
T: termination
E: expiry
de facto supersession
Rel. w/ EC/EU framework:
de facto inside
outside

European Union (EU)
[Cont.]
European Communities (EC)
(Pillar I)

European Atomic Energy Community (EAEC or EURATOM)

[Cont.]

/ / / European Coal and Steel Community (ECSC)

(Distr. of competences)

European Economic Community (EEC)

Schengen Rules
European Community (EC)
TREVI
Justice and Home Affairs (JHA, pillar III)

/ North Atlantic Treaty Organisation (NATO)
[Cont.]
Police and Judicial Co-operation in Criminal Matters (PJCC, pillar III)

Anglo-French alliance
[Defence arm handed to NATO]
European Political Co-operation (EPC)

Common Foreign and Security Policy
(CFSP, pillar II)
Western Union (WU)
/ Western European Union (WEU)
[Tasks defined following the WEU's 1984 reactivation handed to the EU]

[Social, cultural tasks handed to CoE]
[Cont.]

Council of Europe (CoE)
Entente Cordiale
S: 8 April 1904
Dunkirk Treaty (Note: Although not EU treaties per se, these treaties affected the development of the EU defence arm, a main part of the CFSP. The Franco-British alliance established by the Dunkirk Treaty was de facto superseded by WU. The CFSP pillar was bolstered by some of the security structures that had been established within the remit of the 1955 Modified Brussels Treaty (MBT). The Brussels Treaty was terminated in 2011, consequently dissolving the WEU, as the mutual defence clause that the Lisbon Treaty provided for EU was considered to render the WEU superfluous. The EU thus de facto superseded the WEU.)
S: 4 March 1947
F: 8 September 1947
E: 8 September 1997
Brussels Treaty
S: 17 March 1948
F: 25 August 1948
T: 30 June 2011
London and Washington treaties
S: 5 May/4 April 1949
F: 3 August/24 August 1949
Paris treaties: ECSC and EDC (Note: Plans to establish a European Political Community (EPC) were shelved following the French failure to ratify the Treaty establishing the European Defence Community (EDC). The EPC would have combined the ECSC and the EDC.)
S: 18 April 1951/27 May 1952
F: 23 July 1952/?
E: 23 July 2002/—
Protocol Modifying and
Completing the Brussels Treaty
S: 23 October 1954
F: 6 May 1955
Rome treaties: EEC and EAEC
S: 25 March 1957
F: 1 January 1958
WEU-CoE agreement
S: 21 October 1959
F: 1 January 1960
Brussels (Merger) Treaty (Note: The European Communities obtained common institutions and a shared legal personality (i.e. ability to e.g. sign treaties in their own right).)
S: 8 April 1965
F: 1 July 1967
Davignon report
S: 27 October 1970
European Council conclusions
S: 2 December 1975
Single European Act (SEA)
S: 17/28 February 1986
F: 1 July 1987
Schengen Agreement and Convention
S: 14 June 1985/19 June 1990
F: 26 March 1995
Maastricht Treaty (Note: The treaties of Maastricht and Rome form the EU's legal basis, and are also referred to as the Treaty on European Union (TEU) and the Treaty on the Functioning of the European Union (TFEU), respectively. They are amended by secondary treaties.) (Note: Between the EU's founding in 1993 and consolidation in 2009, the union consisted of three pillars, the first of which were the European Communities. The other two pillars consisted of additional areas of cooperation that had been added to the EU's remit.)
S: 7 February 1992
F: 1 November 1993
Amsterdam Treaty
S: 2 October 1997
F: 1 May 1999
Nice Treaty
S: 26 February 2001
F: 1 February 2003
Lisbon Treaty (Note: The consolidation meant that the EU inherited the European Communities' legal personality and that the pillar system was abolished, resulting in the EU framework as such covering all policy areas. Executive/legislative power in each area was instead determined by a distribution of competencies between EU institutions and member states. This distribution, as well as treaty provisions for policy areas in which unanimity is required and qualified majority voting is possible, reflects the depth of EU integration as well as the EU's partly supranational and partly intergovernmental nature.)
S: 13 December 2007
F: 1 December 2009

== Institutions ==
By virtue of the Merger Treaty, all three Communities were governed by the same institutional framework. Prior to 1967, the Common Assembly/European Parliamentary Assembly and the Court of Justice, established by the ECSC, were already shared with the EEC and EAEC, but they had different executives. The 1967 treaty gave the Council and Commission of the EEC responsibility over ECSC and EAEC affairs, abolishing the Councils of the ECSC and EAEC, the Commission of the EAEC and the High Authority of the ECSC. These governed the three Communities until the establishment of the European Union in 1993.

== Members ==
The three Communities shared the same membership, the six states that signed the Treaty of Paris and subsequent treaties were known as the "Inner Six" (the "outer seven" were those countries who formed the European Free Trade Association). The six founding countries were France, West Germany, Italy and the three Benelux countries: Belgium, the Netherlands and Luxembourg. The first enlargement was in 1973, with the accession of Denmark, Ireland and the United Kingdom. Greece, Spain and Portugal joined in the 1980s. Following the creation of the EU in November 1993, it has enlarged to include a further sixteen countries by July 2013.

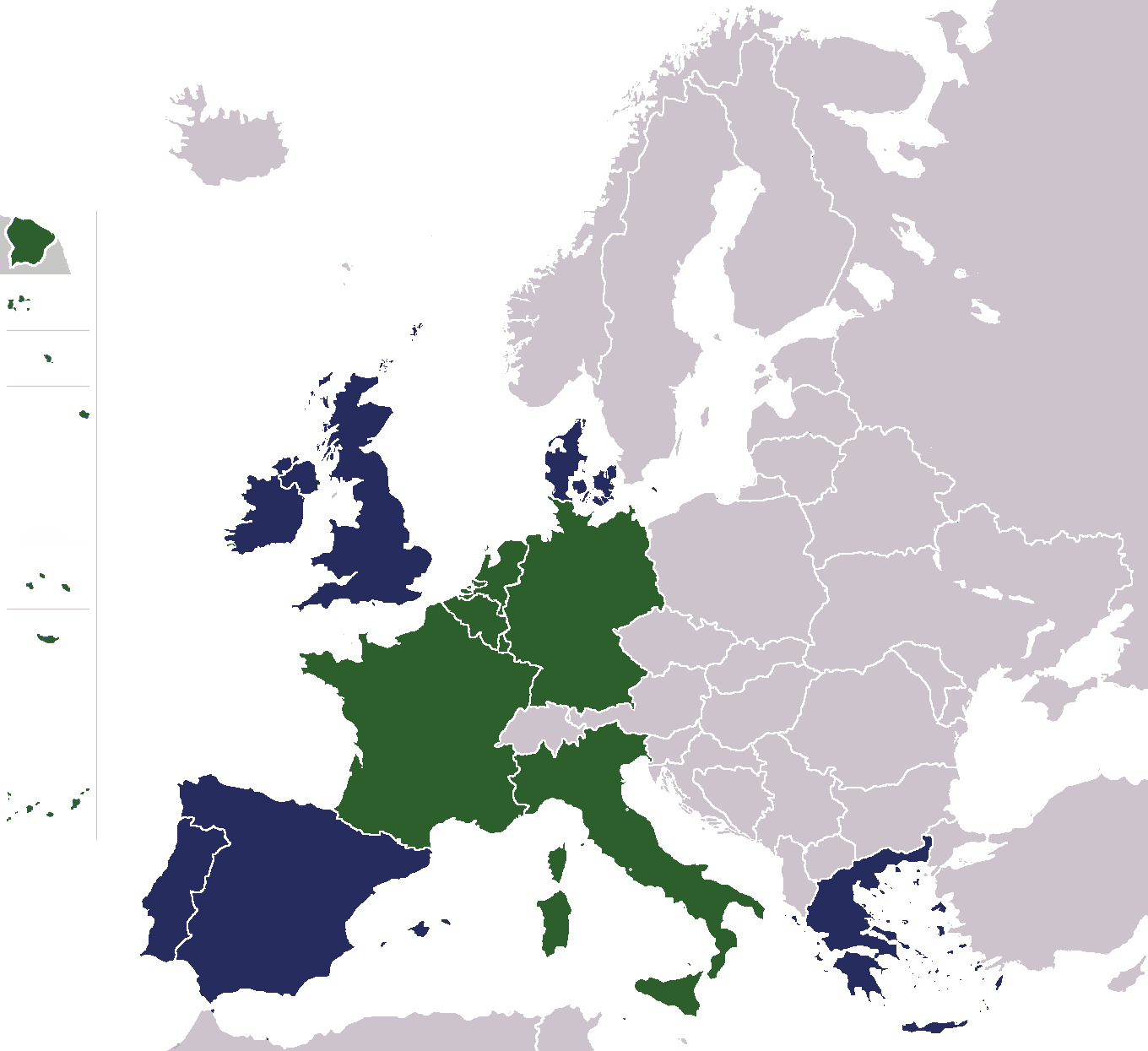
Founding members are shown in green, later members in blue. In 1957 the states that at the time formed East Germany were not part of the Communities, but they became so on German reunification in 1990.

State	Accession
Belgium	25 March 1957
Italy	25 March 1957
Luxembourg	25 March 1957
France	25 March 1957
Netherlands	25 March 1957
West Germany	25 March 1957
Denmark	1 January 1973
Ireland	1 January 1973
United Kingdom	1 January 1973
Greece	1 January 1981
Portugal	1 January 1986
Spain	1 January 1986

Member states are represented in some form in each institution. The Council is also composed of one national minister who represents their national government. Each state also has a right to one European Commissioner each, although in the European Commission they are not supposed to represent their national interest but that of the Community. Prior to 2004, the larger members (France, Germany, Italy and the United Kingdom) had two Commissioners. In the European Parliament, members are allocated a set number seats related to their population, however these (since 1979) have been directly elected and they sit according to political allegiance, not national origin. Most other institutions, including the European Court of Justice, have some form of national division of its members.

== Policy areas ==
At the time of its abolition, the Community pillar covered the following areas:

- Border control
- EU Citizenship
- Common Agricultural Policy
- Common Fisheries Policy
- Competition
- Consumer protection
- Customs union and Single market
- Economic and monetary union
- Education and Culture
- Environmental law
- Employment
- Health care
- Trans-European Networks
- Trade policy
- Research
- Social policy
- Asylum policy
- Schengen treaty
- Immigration policy

== Privileges and immunities ==
The Protocol on the privileges and immunities of the European Communities grants the European Communities and their institutions certain privileges and immunities such as to allow them to perform their tasks. The International Organisations Immunities Act (22 USC § 288h) of the United States has also been extended to the European Communities.

The working conditions of staff are governed by the Communities' staff regulations and not directly by the labour laws of the countries of employment. Their salaries, wages and emoluments are subject to a tax for the benefit of the European Communities and are, in turn, exempt from national taxes.

== See also ==
- Accession of the United Kingdom to the European Communities
- Brussels and the European Union
- Delors Commission
- European institutions in Strasbourg
- Energy Community
- Location of European Union institutions
