= European Political Co-operation =

Former intergovernmental body

The European Political Co-operation (EPC) was the common term for the co-ordination of foreign policy between member states of the European Communities (EC) from its inception in 1970 until the EPC was superseded by the new European Union's (EU) Common Foreign and Security Policy (CFSP) pillar upon the entry into force of the Maastricht Treaty in November 1993.

== Background ==
In the 1950s and 1960s, the EC member states tried twice to give the internal market a foreign policy dimension but failed on both attempts. The concept of EPC had been under consideration from early 60s but due to opinion difference between General de Gaulle and his partners, its implementation had been halted. Subsequent development of both political and economic activities in countries outside Europe forced the members to review their foreign policies. This was after General de Gaulle retired from political office.

== Creation ==
The idea of the supranational European Defence Community came about following a summit in The Hague (1969) in which the EC heads of state and government instructed their foreign ministers to "study the best way of achieving progress in the matter of political unification, within the context of enlargement." The foreign ministers subsequently drafted the Luxembourg/Davignon report (1970), which created an informal intergovernmental consultation mechanism where member states could achieve "politics of scale" (Ginsberg, 1989).

While EPC adopted the intergovernmental nature of the Fouchet Plans, it disregarded the 'French grandeur' of the Charles de Gaulle era. The involvement of the United Kingdom guaranteed its Atlanticist nature. The European Commission would furthermore be able to express its opinion if matters within its competencies were concerned. Finally, the EPC did not have the strong Paris-based Secretariat of the Fouchet proposals. The Netherlands had always been anxious about this idea, as they thought that it might turn into a competitor for the European Commission.

== Changes ==
On 6 January 1981, Hans Dietrich Genscher in his speech emphasized on the importance of EPC strengthening.

The EPC was amended and strengthened in the Copenhagen report (1973) and London report (1981). It was codified (formalized) with the Single European Act (1986).

The EPC turned out to be a "mixed success." During the 1970s, it was an active player in the Middle East conflict and in the creation of the Conference on Security and Co-operation in Europe, the predecessor of the Organization for Security and Co-operation in Europe. The Soviet–Afghan War (1979) and the handling of the Yugoslav Wars (1991–1995), however, showed the weakness of the EPC.

== Transformation into the Common Foreign and Security Policy ==
The EPC was superseded by the Common Foreign and Security Policy in the Maastricht Treaty of November 1993.

Since the end of World War II, most sovereign European countries have entered into treaties and thereby co-operated and harmonised policies (or pooled sovereignty) in an increasing number of areas, in the European integration project or the construction of Europe (French: la construction européenne). The following timeline outlines the legal inception of the European Union (EU)—the principal framework for this unification. The EU inherited many of its present organisations, institutions, and responsibilities from the European Communities (EC), which were founded in the 1950s in the spirit of the Schuman Declaration.

Legend:
S: signing
F: entry into force
T: termination
E: expiry
de facto supersession
Rel. w/ EC/EU framework:
de facto inside
outside

European Union (EU)
[Cont.]
European Communities (EC)
(Pillar I)

European Atomic Energy Community (EAEC or EURATOM)

[Cont.]

/ / / European Coal and Steel Community (ECSC)

(Distr. of competences)

European Economic Community (EEC)

Schengen Rules
European Community (EC)
TREVI
Justice and Home Affairs (JHA, pillar III)

/ North Atlantic Treaty Organisation (NATO)
[Cont.]
Police and Judicial Co-operation in Criminal Matters (PJCC, pillar III)

Anglo-French alliance
[Defence arm handed to NATO]
European Political Co-operation (EPC)

Common Foreign and Security Policy
(CFSP, pillar II)
Western Union (WU)
/ Western European Union (WEU)
[Tasks defined following the WEU's 1984 reactivation handed to the EU]

[Social, cultural tasks handed to CoE]
[Cont.]

Council of Europe (CoE)
Entente Cordiale
S: 8 April 1904
Dunkirk Treaty (Note: Although not EU treaties per se, these treaties affected the development of the EU defence arm, a main part of the CFSP. The Franco-British alliance established by the Dunkirk Treaty was de facto superseded by WU. The CFSP pillar was bolstered by some of the security structures that had been established within the remit of the 1955 Modified Brussels Treaty (MBT). The Brussels Treaty was terminated in 2011, consequently dissolving the WEU, as the mutual defence clause that the Lisbon Treaty provided for EU was considered to render the WEU superfluous. The EU thus de facto superseded the WEU.)
S: 4 March 1947
F: 8 September 1947
E: 8 September 1997
Brussels Treaty
S: 17 March 1948
F: 25 August 1948
T: 30 June 2011
London and Washington treaties
S: 5 May/4 April 1949
F: 3 August/24 August 1949
Paris treaties: ECSC and EDC (Note: Plans to establish a European Political Community (EPC) were shelved following the French failure to ratify the Treaty establishing the European Defence Community (EDC). The EPC would have combined the ECSC and the EDC.)
S: 18 April 1951/27 May 1952
F: 23 July 1952/?
E: 23 July 2002/—
Protocol Modifying and
Completing the Brussels Treaty
S: 23 October 1954
F: 6 May 1955
Rome treaties: EEC and EAEC
S: 25 March 1957
F: 1 January 1958
WEU-CoE agreement
S: 21 October 1959
F: 1 January 1960
Brussels (Merger) Treaty (Note: The European Communities obtained common institutions and a shared legal personality (i.e. ability to e.g. sign treaties in their own right).)
S: 8 April 1965
F: 1 July 1967
Davignon report
S: 27 October 1970
European Council conclusions
S: 2 December 1975
Single European Act (SEA)
S: 17/28 February 1986
F: 1 July 1987
Schengen Agreement and Convention
S: 14 June 1985/19 June 1990
F: 26 March 1995
Maastricht Treaty (Note: The treaties of Maastricht and Rome form the EU's legal basis, and are also referred to as the Treaty on European Union (TEU) and the Treaty on the Functioning of the European Union (TFEU), respectively. They are amended by secondary treaties.) (Note: Between the EU's founding in 1993 and consolidation in 2009, the union consisted of three pillars, the first of which were the European Communities. The other two pillars consisted of additional areas of cooperation that had been added to the EU's remit.)
S: 7 February 1992
F: 1 November 1993
Amsterdam Treaty
S: 2 October 1997
F: 1 May 1999
Nice Treaty
S: 26 February 2001
F: 1 February 2003
Lisbon Treaty (Note: The consolidation meant that the EU inherited the European Communities' legal personality and that the pillar system was abolished, resulting in the EU framework as such covering all policy areas. Executive/legislative power in each area was instead determined by a distribution of competencies between EU institutions and member states. This distribution, as well as treaty provisions for policy areas in which unanimity is required and qualified majority voting is possible, reflects the depth of EU integration as well as the EU's partly supranational and partly intergovernmental nature.)
S: 13 December 2007
F: 1 December 2009

== See also ==
- History of the European Union
- European Defence Community and European Political Community (1952)
- Common Foreign and Security Policy
- Rome Declaration
