= Maastricht Treaty =

1992 founding treaty of the European Union

Treaty on European Union
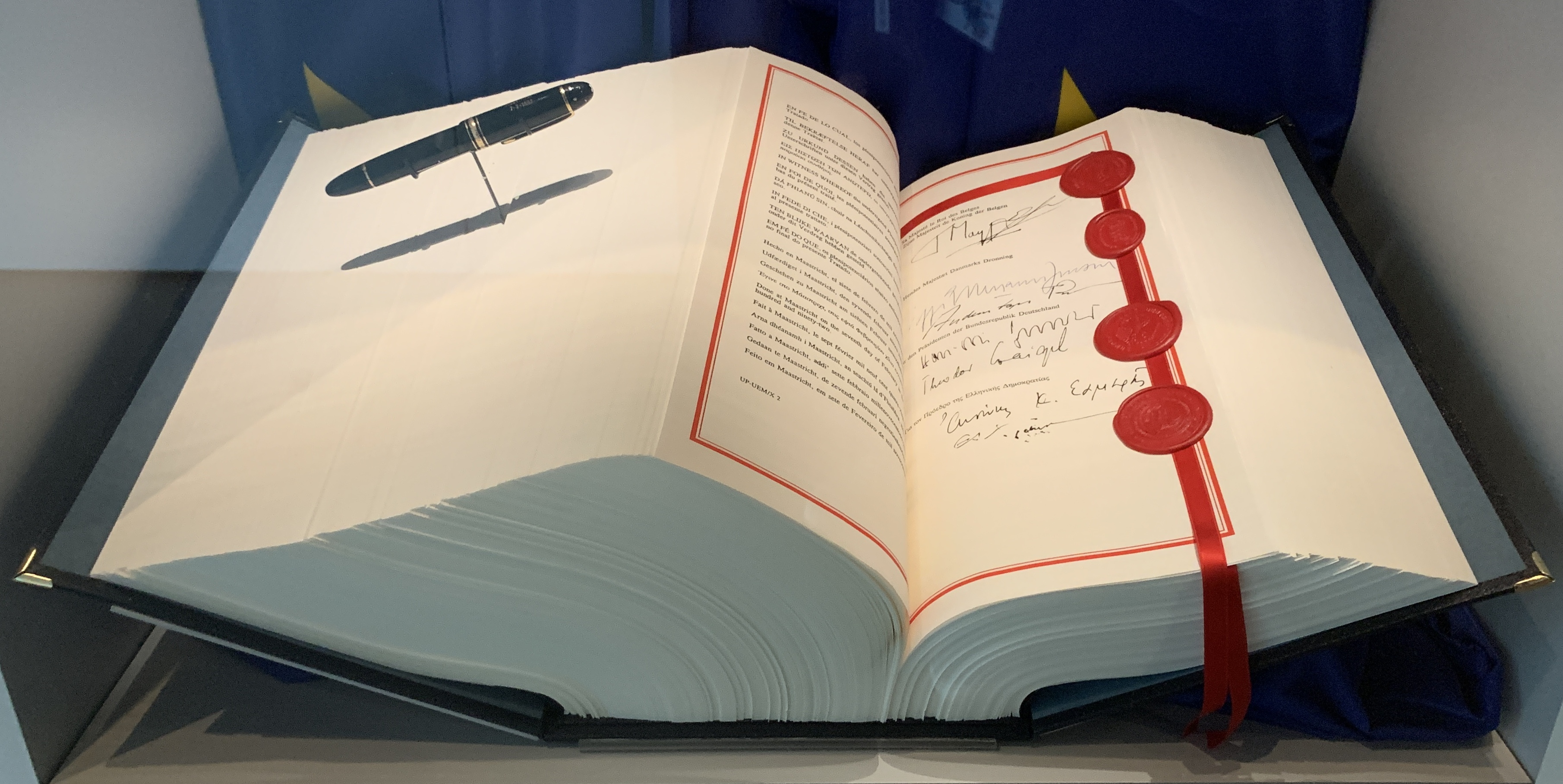
- The Treaty of Maastricht, here shown at an exhibition in Regensburg. The book is opened at a page containing the signatures and seals of the ministers representing the heads of state of Belgium, Denmark, Germany and Greece.
- Type: Founding treaty
- Signed: 7 February 1992
- Location: Maastricht, Netherlands
- Effective: 1 November 1993
- Amendment: Edinburgh Agreement (1992); Treaty of Amsterdam (1999); Treaty of Nice (2003); Treaty of Lisbon (2009)
- Signatories: EU member states
- Depositary: Government of Italy

Full text
- Consolidated version of the Treaty on European Union at Wikisource

The Treaty on European Union, commonly known as the Maastricht Treaty, is the foundation treaty of the European Union (EU). Concluded in 1992 between the then-twelve member states of the European Communities, it announced "a new stage in the process of European integration" chiefly in provisions for a shared European citizenship, for the eventual introduction of a single currency, and (with less precision) for common foreign and security policies, and a number of changes to the European institutions and their decision-making procedures, not least a strengthening of the powers of the European Parliament and more majority voting on the Council of Ministers. Although these were seen by many to presage a "federal Europe", key areas remained inter-governmental with national governments collectively taking key decisions. This constitutional debate continued through the negotiation of subsequent treaties (see below), culminating in the 2007 Treaty of Lisbon.

In the wake of the Eurozone debt crisis unfolding from 2009, the most enduring reference to the Maastricht Treaty has been to the rules of compliance – the "Maastricht criteria" – for the currency union.

Against the background of the end of the Cold War and the re-unification of Germany, and in anticipation of accelerated globalisation, the treaty negotiated tensions between member states seeking deeper integration and those wishing to retain greater national control. The resulting compromise faced what was to be the first in a series of EU treaty ratification crises.

== Overview ==
Having "resolved to continue the process of creating an ever closer union among the people of Europe", the Treaty proposes "further steps to be taken in order to advance European integration" under seven titles.

Title I, Common Provisions, establishes the European Union (EU) on the foundation of the three, already partially merged, European Communities: the European Economic Community (EEC), the European Coal and Steel Community (ECSC) and the European Atomic Energy Community (Euratom). It confirms among its objectives are "the introduction of a citizenship of the Union" common to the nationals of the Member States; "economic and monetary union, ultimately including a single currency"; and "a common foreign and security policy including the eventual framing of a common defence".

Title II, Provisions Amending the Treaty Establishing the European Economic Community, reformulates the EEC as the central "pillar" of the Union. It amends the EEC's Treaty of Rome constitution, renaming it the European Community to reflect the Union's broader ambition. Amendments incorporate (as detailed in attached protocols) a staged progression toward monetary union including the price-stability-first criteria for adoption of the single currency and for the operations of the prospective European Central Bank (ECB).

Other amendments create the office of European Ombudsman, expand the Structural Fund assistance to the poorer EU regions; and broaden Community competencies in education, culture, public health, consumer protection, trans-European networks, industry and the environment.

In these and other areas which do not fall within Community's "exclusive competence", in accordance with "the principle of subsidiarity" action is to be taken only if, "by reason of the scale or effects", the objectives cannot be more "efficiently" achieved by the Member States themselves.

In several of these areas, the Treaty seeks to enhance the "democratic functioning" of the institutions by conceding the directly elected European Parliament rights not only of consultation but also of co-decision on some categories of European legislation. It also grants the Parliament the power to confirm (and therefore to veto) the Council's nominations for the European Commission, the Community's executive.

Titles III and IV amend the treaties establishing the ECSC and Euratom to complete their absorption into the structure of European Community.

Title V and VI extend existing intergovernmental consultations on foreign-policy, security and defence matters, and on "cooperation in the fields of justice and home affairs". In both cases, Member States are to "inform and consult one another within the Council [of Ministers]", but otherwise cooperate independently of Community institutions.

Title VII, Final Provisions, covers a number of anomalous issues. Provided that all Member States ratify, it rules that the Treaty should come into force on 1 January 1993.

Articles within the Treaty were referred to by using the letters A to S.

Annexed to the Treaty is a Protocol, and an Agreement, on Social Policy. With a view to ensuring that the dynamic of the European single market respect certain minimum social and employment protections, these allow the Council of Ministers to approve relevant proposals from the European Commission on the basis of a qualified majority rather than unanimous consent.

The United Kingdom was not a party of the Agreement on Social Policy and secured an "opt out" from the protocol. It was to do the same with respect to the obligation to enter the final, single-currency, stage of monetary union (the UK would not have to give up the pound sterling).

== Procedural history ==
=== Signatories ===
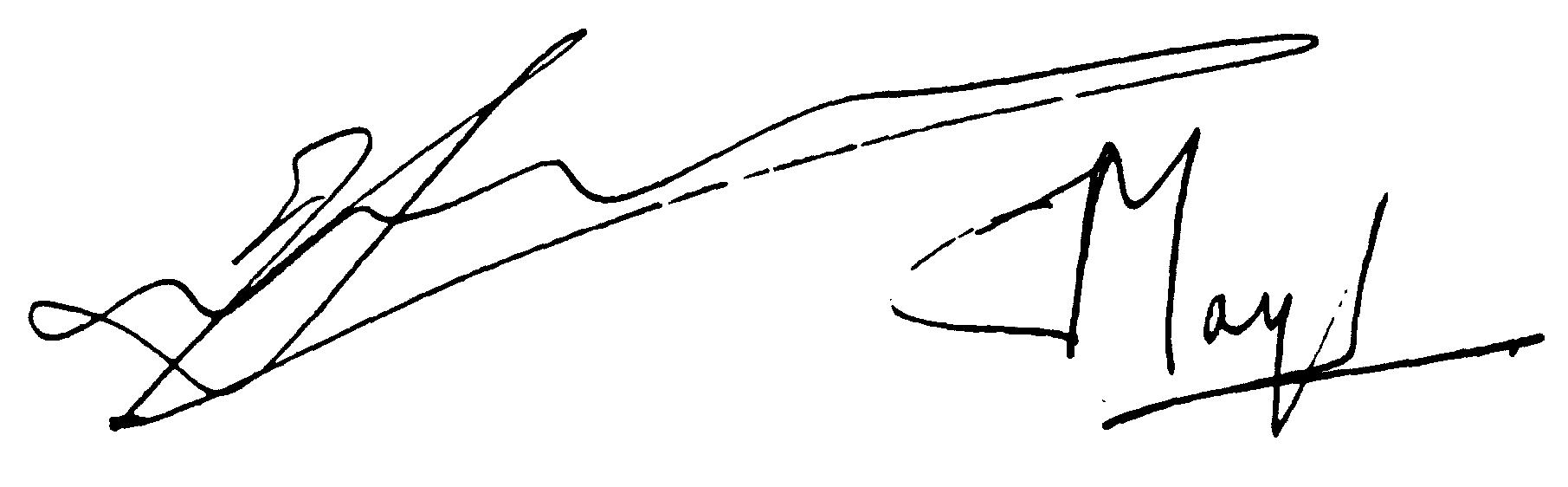
Belgium

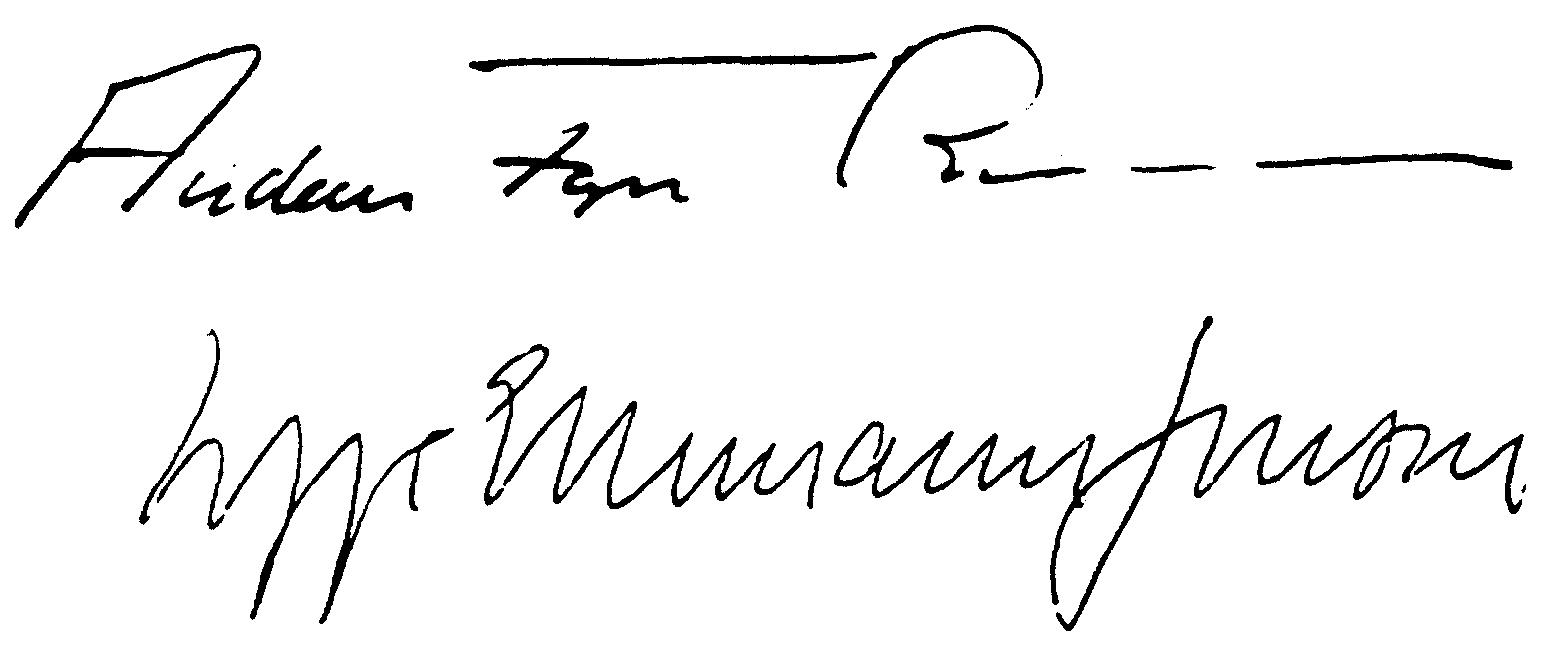
Denmark

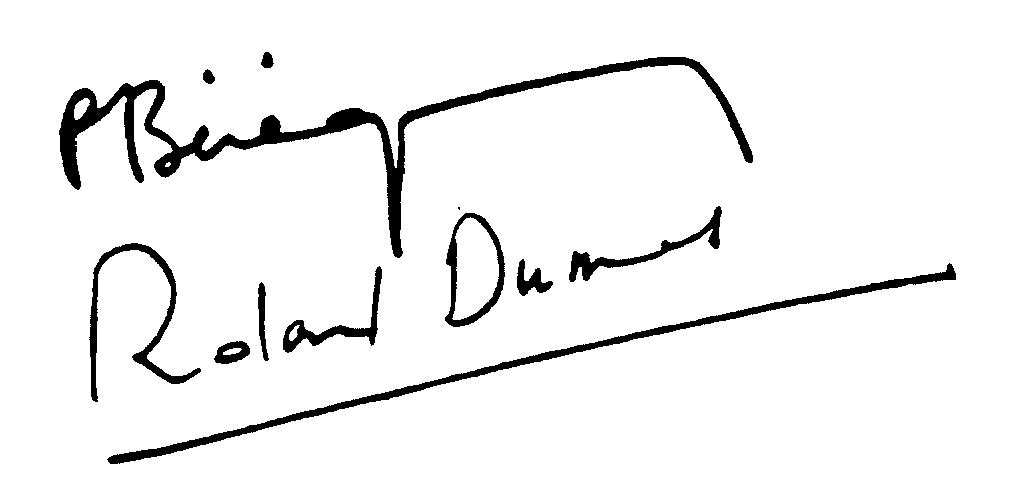
France

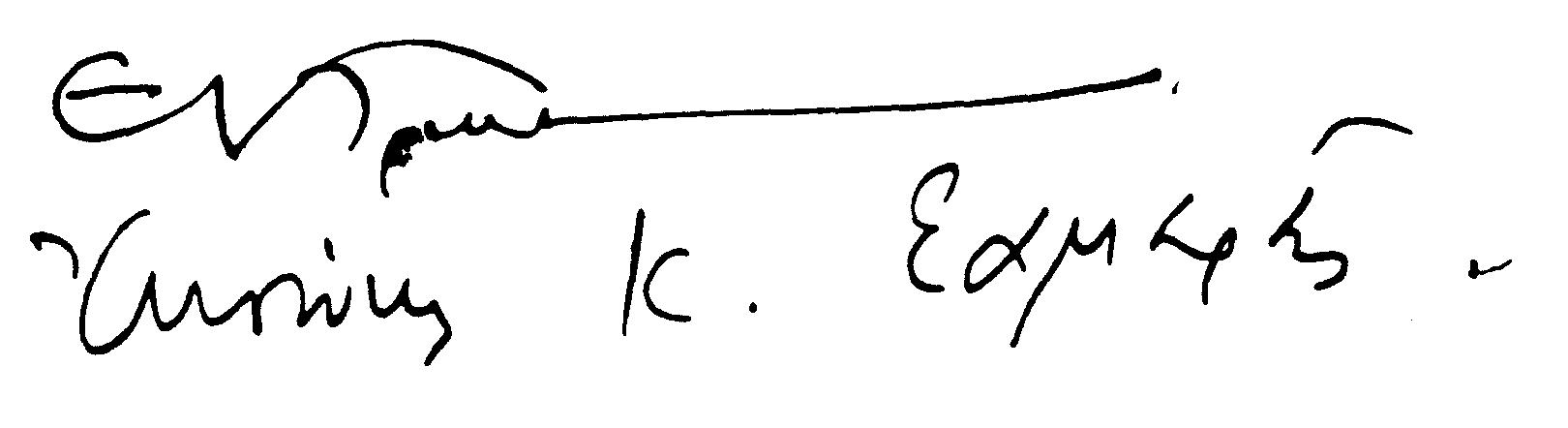
Greece

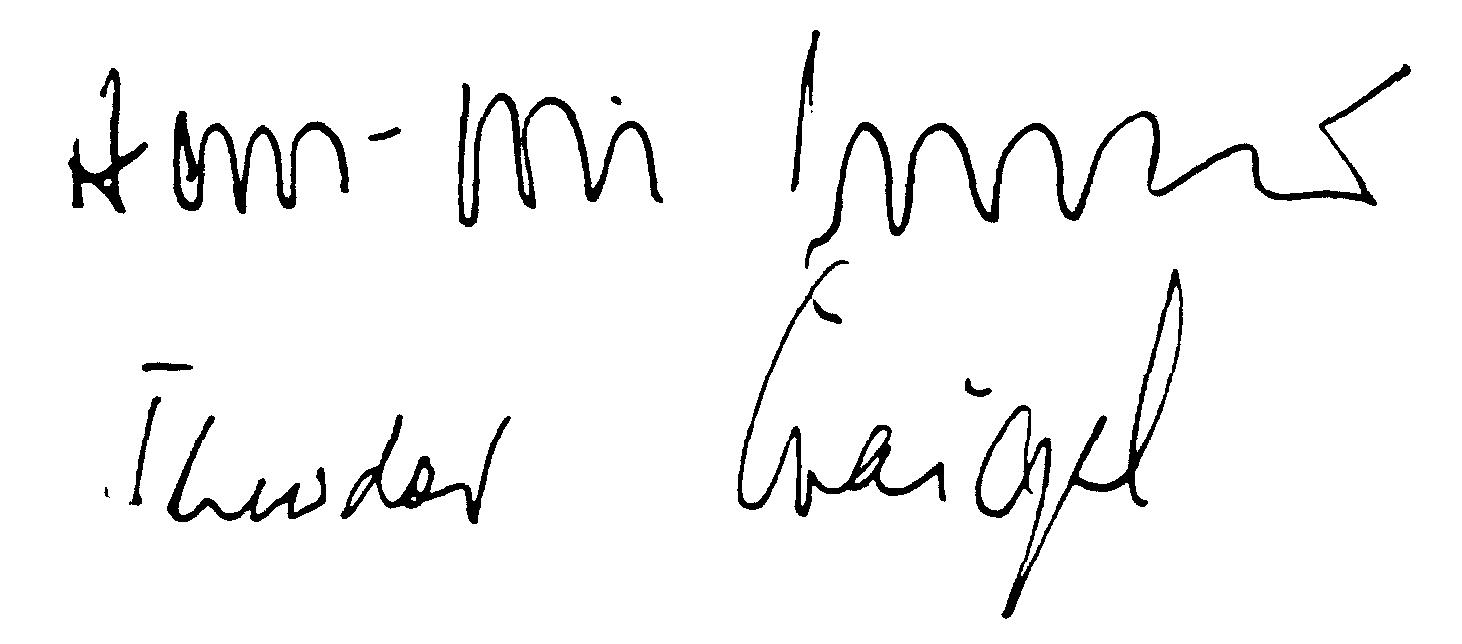
Germany

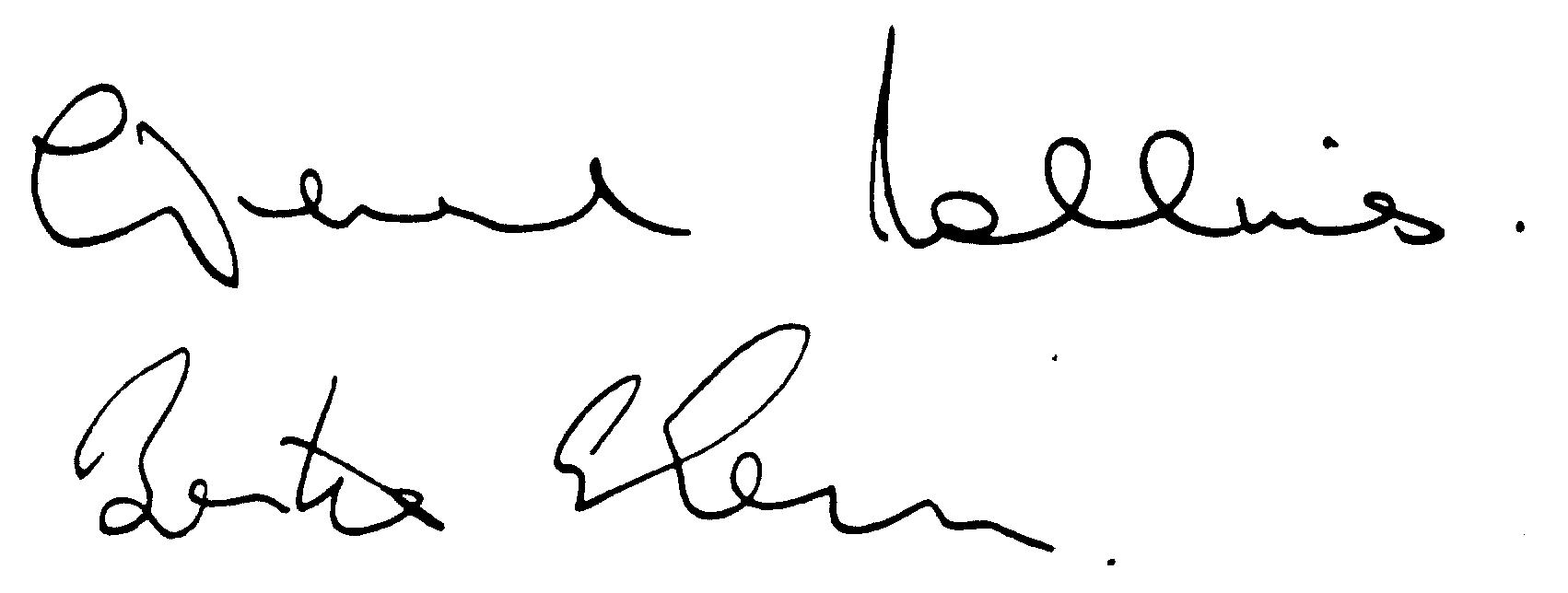
Ireland

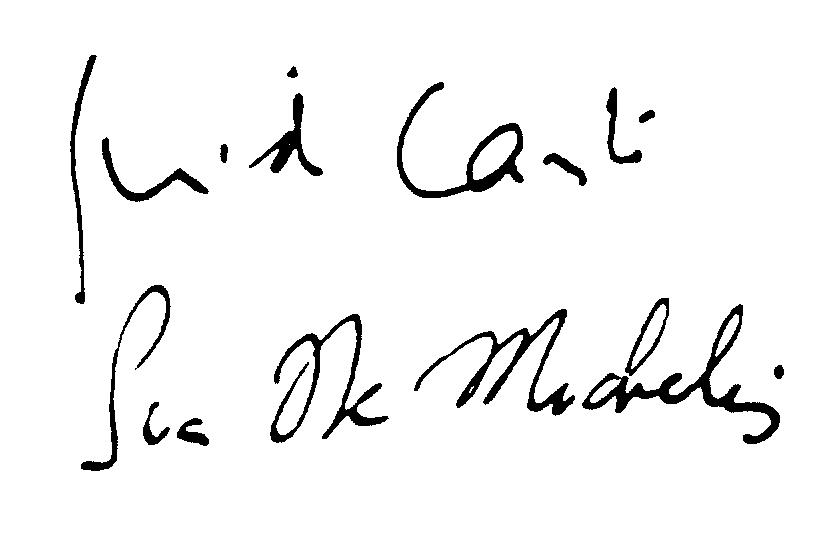
Italy

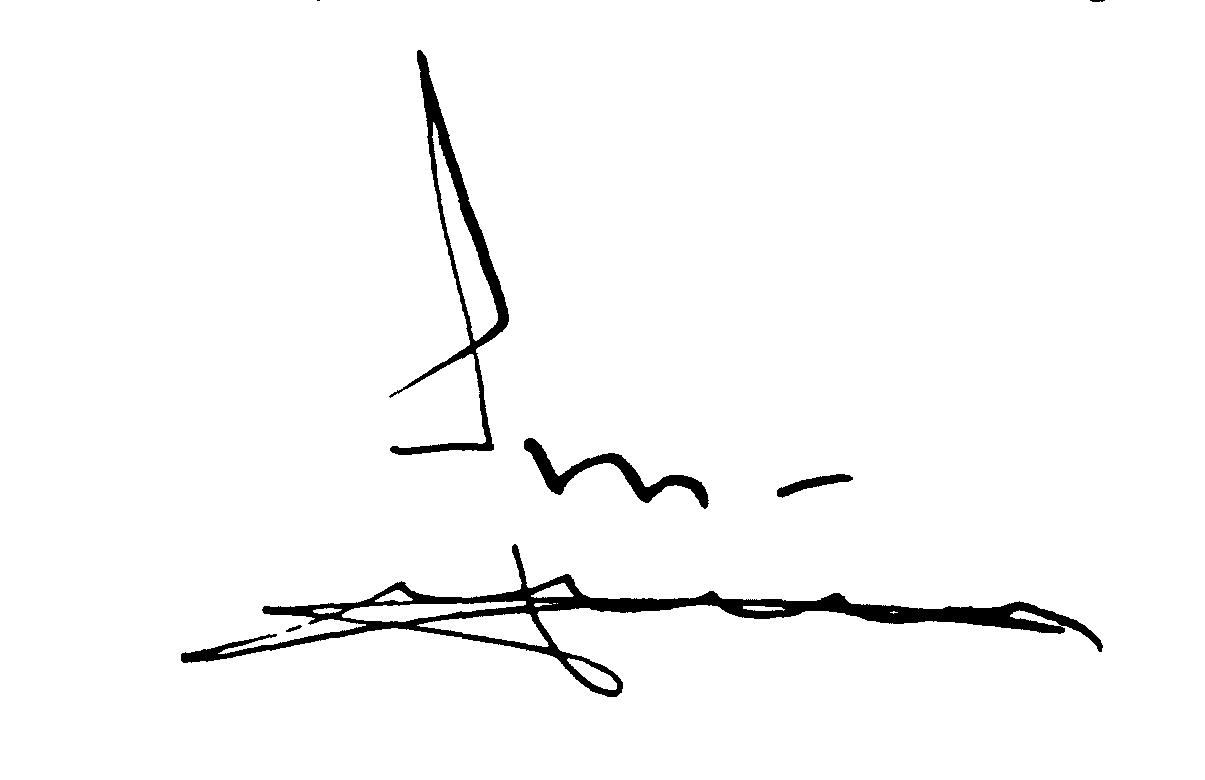
Luxembourg

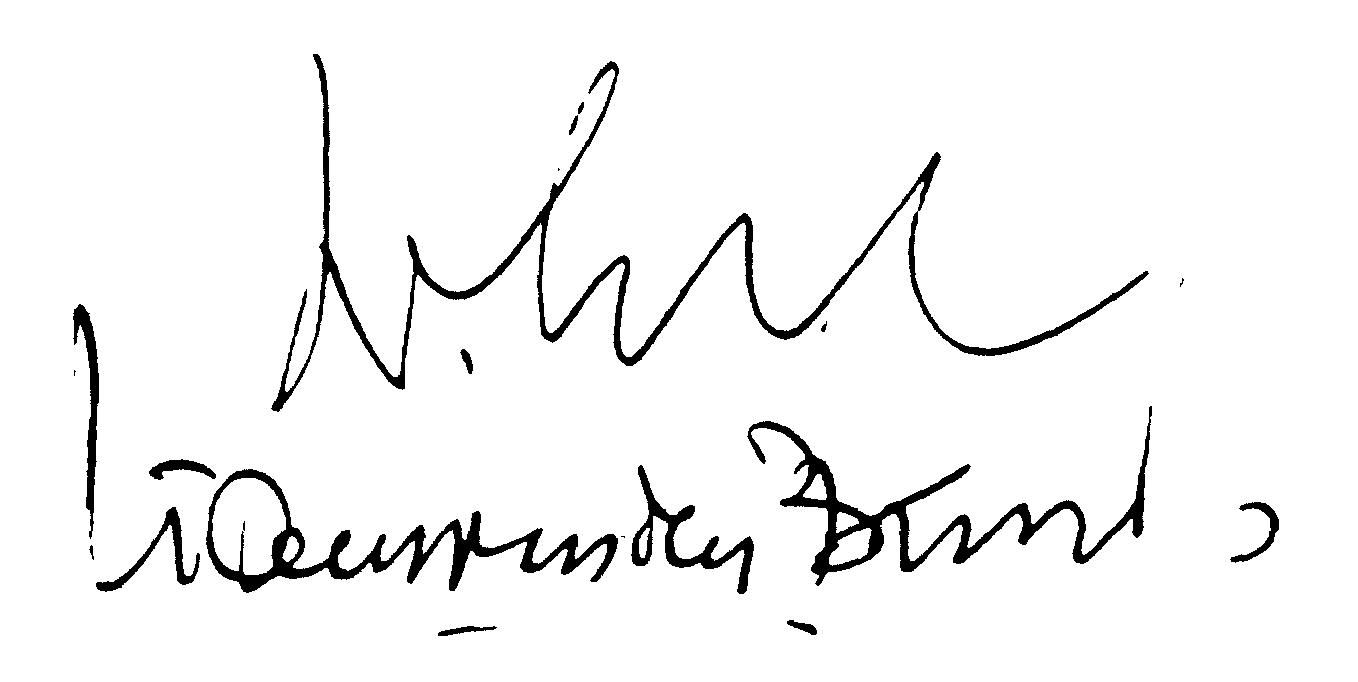
Netherlands

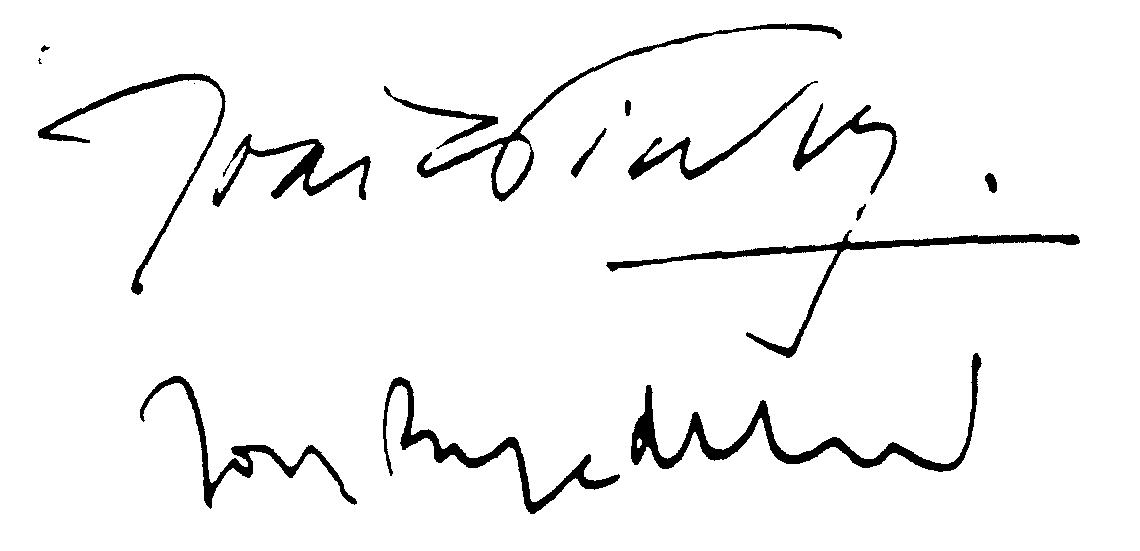
Portugal

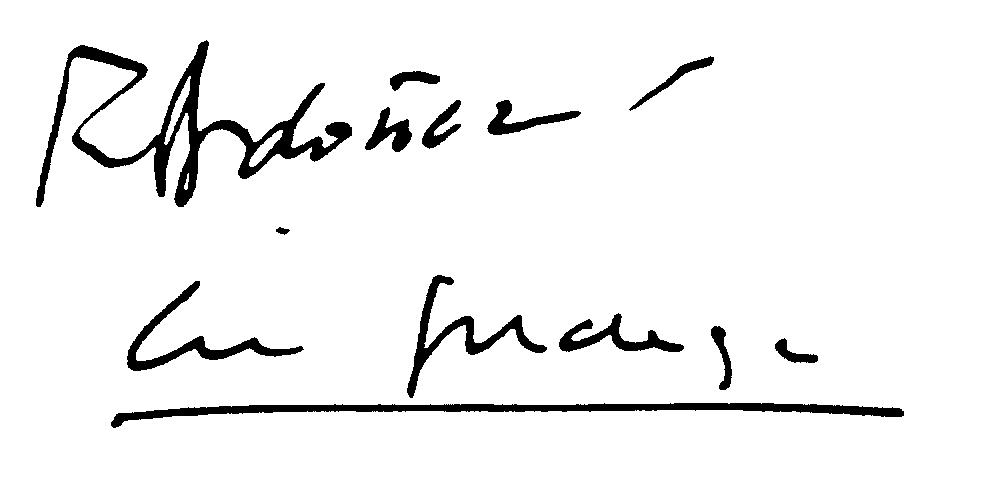
Spain

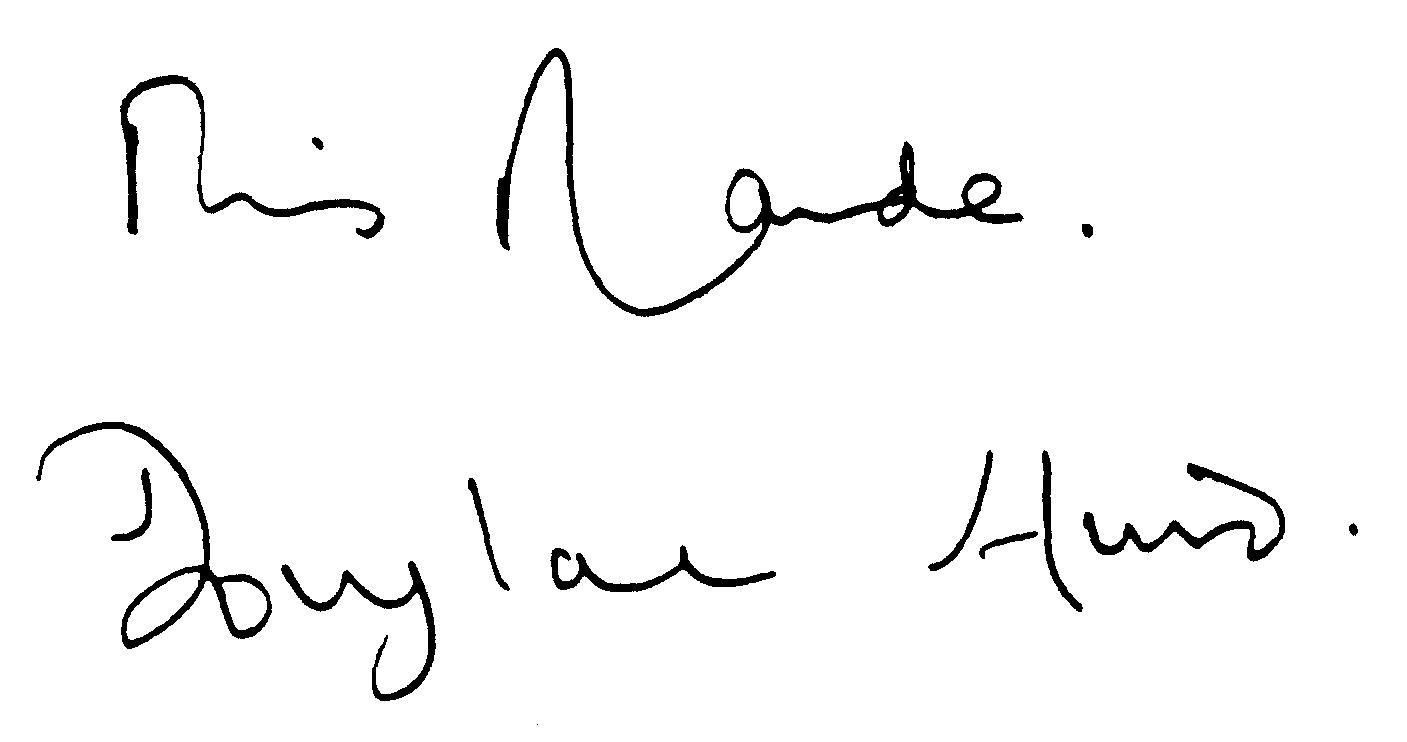
United Kingdom

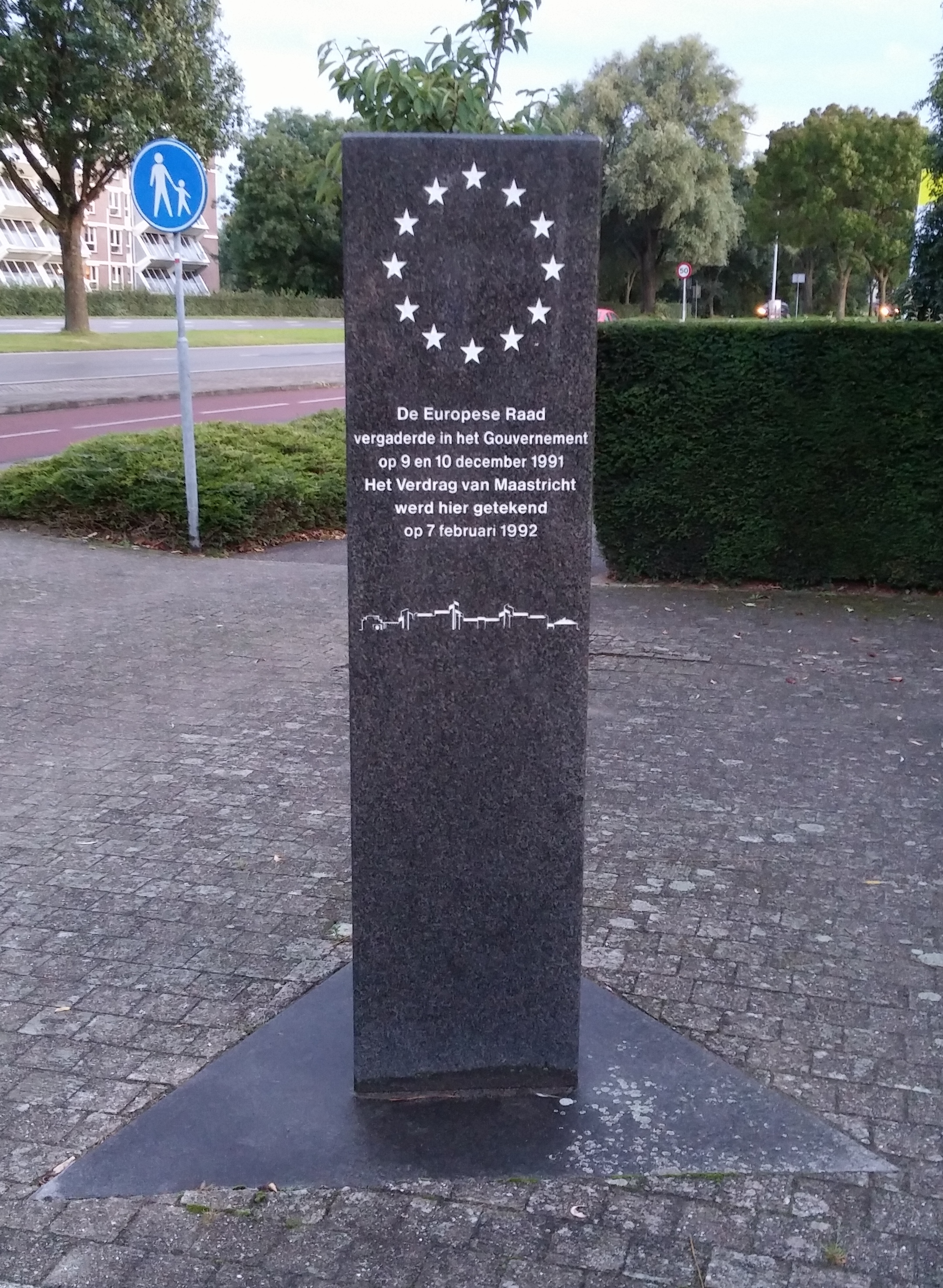
Stone memorial in front of the entry to the Limburg Province government building in Maastricht, Netherlands, commemorating the signing of the Maastricht Treaty

The signatory nations were represented by:

- Mark Eyskens and Philippe Maystadt (Belgium)
- Uffe Ellemann-Jensen and Anders Fogh Rasmussen (Denmark)
- Roland Dumas and Pierre Bérégovoy (France)
- Antonis Samaras and Efthymios Christodoulou (Greece)
- Gerry Collins and Bertie Ahern (Ireland)
- Gianni De Michelis and Guido Carli (Italy)
- Jacques Poos and Jean-Claude Juncker (Luxembourg)
- Hans van den Broek and Wim Kok (Netherlands)
- João de Deus Pinheiro and Jorge Braga de Macedo (Portugal)
- Francisco Fernández Ordóñez and Carlos Solchaga (Spain)
- Douglas Hurd and Francis Maude (United Kingdom)
- Hans-Dietrich Genscher and Theo Waigel (Germany)

In consequence of the Dutch Presidency of the Council of the European Communities during the previous six months of negotiation, the Treaty was signed in the Netherlands, in the city of Maastricht. The twelve members of the European Communities signing the Treaty on 7 February 1992 were Belgium, Denmark, France, Germany, Greece, Ireland, Italy, Luxembourg, Portugal, Spain, the Netherlands and the United Kingdom.

=== Ratification ===
Ratification of the treaty was completed by the twelve members of the EC by mid-1993 and came into legal force on 1 November 1993.

The Treaty noted that it should be "ratified by the High Contracting Parties in accordance with their respective constitutional requirement". In the cases of Denmark, France and Ireland this required referendums.

In the first Danish referendum, on 2 June 1992, the treaty was rejected by a margin of 50.7% to 49.3%. Concessions secured by the end of year in Edinburgh including, critically, the same exemption secured by Britain from the single currency (Denmark would not have to give up the krone), allowed for a second referendum. On 18 May 1993, the Maastricht Treaty was endorsed by a vote of 56.7%.

In Ireland, the Eleventh Amendment of the Constitution, allowing the state to ratify the Treaty, was approved in a referendum held on 18 June 1992 with the support of 69.1% of votes cast.

In September 1992, a referendum in France narrowly supported the ratification of the treaty, with 50.8% in favour. This narrow vote for ratification in France, known at the time as the 'petit oui', led Jacques Delors to comment that "Europe began as an elitist project in which it was believed that all that was required was to convince the decision-makers. That phase of benign despotism is over."

In the United Kingdom parliament ratification did not command a clear majority. In protest against the social-policy opt out, Labour opposed, while "anti-federalists" split the governing Conservatives. Prime Minister John Major was able to face down his "Maastricht Rebels" only by tying ratification to the survival of the government in a vote of confidence. (Researchers and observers suggest that, in the United Kingdom, the Maastricht Treaty represented "a critical turning point" in terms of divisions within the Conservative Party over European integration and the ruling party's ultimate fragmentation in 2016 into Leave and Remain factions).

In Germany, the Maastricht Treaty passed the Bundestag on 2 December 1992, with a majority of 543 out of 562, and the Bundesrat with unanimity. The Bundestag was required to amend the Grundgesetz (German Basic Law) to "legalize Germany's membership in the European Union (Article 23) as well as to install a European Monetary Union (Article 88)." The ratification was delayed by challenges at the German Federal Constitutional Court, the complainants claiming the amendments transferring sovereign competencies to the European Union violated democratic principles (Article 20 and 38(1)) of the Grundgesetz that were unamendable (Article 79(3)); hence the Maastricht Treaty should be inadmissible. The court delivered its judgment on 12 October 1993 ruling the Maastricht Treaty compatible with the Grundgesetz, but provided that the European Union could not endow itself with more powers without the Bundestag's approval. The court also confirmed its Solange II decision accepting the supremacy of European Court of Justice decisions while retaining the power to review secondary community law as to guarantee basic rights protection in close cooperation with the European Court of Justice. Germany was the last member state to ratify the treaty and it entered into force on 1 November 1993.

== Citizenship of the European Union ==
From the establishment of the European Economic Community in 1957, integrationists argued the free movement of workers was the logical corollary of the free movement of capital, goods and services and integral to the establishment of a common (and later single) European market. In time, the tension between the transferred worker as "a mobile unit of production" contributing to the success of the single market, and the reality of the Community migrants as individuals, seeking to exercise "a personal right" to live and work in another state for their own, and their families', welfare, asserted itself. The Treaty built on the growing suggestion that there was a Community-wide basis for citizenship rights.

The Treaty rules that "every person holding the nationality of a Member State shall be a citizen of the Union". This common and parallel citizenship accords the Member State migrants not only the civil right to take up residence and employment, but also, and for the first time, political rights. In a new EU country of residence Member-State nationals have the right to vote, and to stand, in both local and European elections. Unresolved in the Treaty is the question of their access to social rights. Political debate continued as to who should have access to public services and welfare systems funded by taxation.

== Economic and monetary union ==
=== Franco-German agreement ===
French President François Mitterrand was forced to abandon the centrepiece of his Socialist programme in 1983, a job creating reflation, due to speculation against the franc. Since then, Mitterrand had been committed to drawing Germany into a currency partnership. After the fall of the Berlin Wall in late 1989, Germany sought re-unification. France, the UK, and the rest of Europe expressed their concerns over re-unification. When German Chancellor Helmut Kohl asked for re-unification in 1990, Mitterrand would only accept in the event Germany would abandon the Deutsche Mark and adopt a common currency. Without consulting Karl Otto Pöhl, President of the Bundesbank, Kohl accepted the deal. Despite this win for France, it was widely perceived that the cost of German cooperation was German dictation of the rules for a single currency. The Bundesbank had signalled that Germany's economic success would come before being "a good european".

=== The ERM crises ===
In the UK, the Maastricht rebellion drew on the experience of Black Wednesday. On 16 September 1992 the British government had been forced to withdraw the pound sterling from the European Exchange Rate Mechanism (ERM). This was the centrepiece of the European Monetary System (EMS), agreed in 1978 as a means of reducing the "barrier" that exchange-rate volatility presented for intra-Community commerce (and for the management of payments under the Common Agricultural Policy).

Britain had signed up to the ERM in 1990 as a token of the government's commitment to control inflation (then running at three times the rate of Germany). From the beginning of 1990, high German interest rates, set by the Bundesbank to counteract inflationary impact of the expenditure on German reunification, caused significant stress across the whole of the ERM. By the time of their own ratifications debates, France and Denmark also found themselves under pressure in foreign exchange markets, their currencies trading close to the bottom of their ERM bands. In Britain, the government of John Major failed in a costly attempt to keep the pound above its mandated exchange rate limit. While a political humiliation, sterling's exit from the ERM was followed in the UK by economic recovery and a significant fall in unemployment.

=== The Maastricht criteria ===
Having "resolved to achieve the strengthening and the convergence and to establish an economic and monetary union including,... a single and stable currency", the Treaty ruled that "Member States shall regard their economic policies as a matter of common concern", and that the obligations assumed should be a matter for "mutual surveillance". Commonly known as the Maastricht criteria, these obligations represented the performance thresholds for member states to progress toward the third stage of European Economic and Monetary Union (EMU), the adoption the common currency (designated at the 1995 Madrid European Council as the Euro).

The four "convergence criteria", as detailed in attached protocols, impose control over inflation, public debt and the public deficit, exchange rate stability and domestic interest rates. With limited leeway granted in exceptional circumstances, the obligations are to maintain:

1. inflation at a rate no more than 1.5 percentage points higher than the average of the three best performing (lowest inflation) Member States;

2. a "budgetary position" that avoids "excessive" government deficits defined in ratios to gross domestic product (GDP) of greater than 3% for annual deficits and 60% for gross government debt;

3. the exchange rate of the national currency within "the normal fluctuation margins by the exchange-rate mechanism of the European Monetary System without severe tensions for at least the last two years"; and

4. nominal long-term interest rates no more than 2 percentage points higher than in the three Member States with the lowest inflation.

=== The European Central Bank mandate ===
These criteria in turn dictated the mandate of the European System of Central Banks comprising the national central banks, but to include the prospective currency-issuing European Central Bank. As envisaged by the Treaty, the ECB replaced its shadow European Monetary Institute on 1 June 1998, and began exercising its full powers with the introduction of the euro on 1 January 1999.

The Treaty dedicates the EU central banking system to price stability, and gives it "a degree of independence from elected officials" greater even "than that of its putative model, the German Bundesbank". Whereas the Bundesbank, under article 12 of its constitution, is "bound to support the general economic policy of the [German] Federal Government", the obligation of the ECB to "support the general economic policies in the Community" is to be "without prejudice" to price stability, the Bank's "primary objective". It is further conditioned by the express understanding that "neither the ECB, nor a national central bank, nor any member of their decision-making bodies, shall seek or take instructions from Community institutions or bodies from any Government of a Member State or from any other body."

Seeming to further preclude any possibility of the single-currency banking system being used to regulate European financial markets in support of potentially inflationary policies, the Treaty expressly prohibits the ECB or any Member State central extending "overdraft facilities or any other type of credit facility" to "Community institutions or bodies, central governments, regional, local or other public authorities, other bodies governed by public law, or public undertakings of Member States", or the purchase from them debt instruments.

=== The Maastricht economic-policy model ===
Critics felt that, in limiting the role of the future ECB and euro in national, or Union-coordinated, reflationary policies, Maastricht affirmed what by the late 1980s was the general economic-policy orthodoxy within the Community. This has been described as a "reversed Keynesianism": macro-economic policy not to secure a full-employment level of demand, but, through the restrictive control of monetary growth and public expenditure, to maintain price and financial market stability; micro economic policy, not to engineer income and price controls in support of fiscal expansion, but to encourage job creation by reducing barriers to lower labour costs. The commitment to monetary union and the convergence criteria denied member states the resort to currency deflation to ease balance-of-payments constraints on domestic spending, and left labour market "flexibility" as the main mean of coping with asymmetric economic shocks.

These constraints were to become the focus of political scrutiny and public protest in the new-century European debt crisis. Beginning in 2009 with Greece, the governments of several Euro-zone countries (Portugal, Ireland, Spain and Cyprus) declared themselves unable to repay or refinance their government debt or to bail out over-indebted banks without assistance from third parties. The "austerity" they had to subsequently impose as a condition of assistance from Germany and other of their trade-surplus EU partners, raised calls for new arrangements to better manage payment imbalances between member states, and ease the burden of adjustment upon wage-, and benefit-, dependent households. Greek finance minister Yanis Varoufakis credited the Maastricht criteria with framing of a union of deflation and unemployment.

Taking issue in defence of the Maastricht criteria, German finance minister Wolfgang Schäuble argued that "the old way to stimulate growth will not work." There is a real "moral hazard" in allowing Member States to accumulate higher debts within the Eurozone – higher debts which, ultimately, have no relationship to higher growth. The Maastricht criteria, he insisted, were correct in placing the onus for growth on "competitiveness, structural reforms, investment, and sustainable financing".

== Foreign and security policy, justice and home affairs ==
Set alongside the European Community, the cooperation proposed in the Maastricht Treaty on foreign and security policy, and on justice and home affairs, were characterised in official commentary as the second and third "pillars" of the Union. The Treaty, however, proposed no significant departures in these areas. Coordination in foreign and security policy had taken place since the beginning of the 1970s under the name of European Political Cooperation (EPC), which had been first written into the treaties by the 1987 Single European Act. Cooperation on law enforcement, criminal justice, asylum, and immigration and other judicial matters was being pursued under the 1990 Schengen Agreement and Convention.

The new provisions called on governments to "inform and consult one another within the Council of Ministers", but otherwise continued cooperation on the basis of intergovernmental liaison outside of the EC and its institutions. The West European Union, an until recently moribund club within NATO, is described as "an integral part of the development of the Union", and asked it to help "elaborate and implement decisions and actions of the Union which have defence implications. Yet it is clear that nothing is to be construed as systematically constraining the foreign or defence policies of the individual Member States. "Failing a Council decision", which would require unanimity, a Member State is free to take such action as it considers "necessary". This, in part, was a concession to United Kingdom which continued to insist on the sufficiency of the North Atlantic alliance (supported by the non-aligned Member States, Ireland and Austria, at the 1997 Amsterdam summit, the UK prevented a merger of the WEU and the EU),

== Subsidiarity and co-decision ==
As an implicit presumption subsidiarity may have been considered a check upon the supranational development of the EEC. But in making it an explicit constitutional principle the Maastricht Treaty opened up "debates about whether this strengthened the states, regions or local government vis-à-vis the EU or vice versa". Subsidiarity can be read as a federalising principle. For every endeavour it poses the question of whether national or Community policy is the most effective means, and elevates simple utility above any deference to national or local feeling, albeit with a presumption that action will be taken at European level only where national efforts cannot achieve the objective in question.

Sceptics note that the Treaty offers no legally actionable definition of subsidiarity. Rather there are "a series of tentative indications for Community action in a document full of imprecise concepts: 'sufficiently', 'better achieved', 'what is necessary', 'to achieve the objectives', subjective notions which leave the way wide open for interpretation or practical developments." Jacques Santer, Prime Minister of Luxembourg, conceded that consensus around the principle of subsidiarity had been possible only because "it conceals different interpretations".

The 1992 Treaty may have introduced a more consequential constitutional principle in its promotion "co-decision". It introduced procedures that made the European Parliament "co-legislator with the Council of Ministers" and have since been developed and extended to nearly all areas where the Council decides on legislation by qualified majority voting. The "foundations of co-decision in the Maastricht Treaty" have led to ways to reconcile differences between the Parliament and the Council, formally through a "conciliation procedure" and informally through "trialogues" involving negotiations between the European Parliament, Council and Commission, which have become standard in most legislative procedures.

== Amending Treaties ==
In establishing the European Union the Maastricht Treaty amended the treaties that had established the European Communities in the 1950s. Following the EU accessions of Austria, Finland, and Sweden, it was in turn amended by the treaties of Amsterdam (1997), and Nice (2001). Following the accession of a further twelve states, ten from the former Eastern Bloc – Bulgaria, the Czech Republic, Estonia, Hungary, Latvia, Lithuania, Poland, Romania, Slovakia and Slovenia – plus Cyprus and Malta, and an aborted Treaty on a European Constitution, the Treaty on European Union and the Treaty Establishing the European Community (TEC) were more comprehensively revisited. The 2007 Treaty of Lisbon amends both again and renames the TEC as the Treaty on the Functioning of the European Union (TFEU).

== Timeline ==
Since the end of World War II, most sovereign European countries have entered into treaties and thereby co-operated and harmonised policies (or pooled sovereignty) in an increasing number of areas, in the European integration project or the construction of Europe (French: la construction européenne). The following timeline outlines the legal inception of the European Union (EU) — the principal framework for this unification. The EU inherited many of its present organisations, institutions and responsibilities from the European Communities (EC), which were founded in the 1950s in the spirit of the Schuman Declaration.

Legend:
S: signing
F: entry into force
T: termination
E: expiry
de facto supersession
Rel. w/ EC/EU framework:
de facto inside
outside

European Union (EU)
[Cont.]
European Communities (EC)
(Pillar I)

European Atomic Energy Community (EAEC or EURATOM)

[Cont.]

/ / / European Coal and Steel Community (ECSC)

(Distr. of competences)

European Economic Community (EEC)

Schengen Rules
European Community (EC)
TREVI
Justice and Home Affairs (JHA, pillar III)

/ North Atlantic Treaty Organisation (NATO)
[Cont.]
Police and Judicial Co-operation in Criminal Matters (PJCC, pillar III)

Anglo-French alliance
[Defence arm handed to NATO]
European Political Co-operation (EPC)

Common Foreign and Security Policy
(CFSP, pillar II)
Western Union (WU)
/ Western European Union (WEU)
[Tasks defined following the WEU's 1984 reactivation handed to the EU]

[Social, cultural tasks handed to CoE]
[Cont.]

Council of Europe (CoE)
Entente Cordiale
S: 8 April 1904
Dunkirk Treaty (Note: Although not EU treaties per se, these treaties affected the development of the EU defence arm, a main part of the CFSP. The Franco-British alliance established by the Dunkirk Treaty was de facto superseded by WU. The CFSP pillar was bolstered by some of the security structures that had been established within the remit of the 1955 Modified Brussels Treaty (MBT). The Brussels Treaty was terminated in 2011, consequently dissolving the WEU, as the mutual defence clause that the Lisbon Treaty provided for EU was considered to render the WEU superfluous. The EU thus de facto superseded the WEU.)
S: 4 March 1947
F: 8 September 1947
E: 8 September 1997
Brussels Treaty
S: 17 March 1948
F: 25 August 1948
T: 30 June 2011
London and Washington treaties
S: 5 May/4 April 1949
F: 3 August/24 August 1949
Paris treaties: ECSC and EDC (Note: Plans to establish a European Political Community (EPC) were shelved following the French failure to ratify the Treaty establishing the European Defence Community (EDC). The EPC would have combined the ECSC and the EDC.)
S: 18 April 1951/27 May 1952
F: 23 July 1952/?
E: 23 July 2002/—
Protocol Modifying and
Completing the Brussels Treaty
S: 23 October 1954
F: 6 May 1955
Rome treaties: EEC and EAEC
S: 25 March 1957
F: 1 January 1958
WEU-CoE agreement
S: 21 October 1959
F: 1 January 1960
Brussels (Merger) Treaty (Note: The European Communities obtained common institutions and a shared legal personality (i.e. ability to e.g. sign treaties in their own right).)
S: 8 April 1965
F: 1 July 1967
Davignon report
S: 27 October 1970
European Council conclusions
S: 2 December 1975
Single European Act (SEA)
S: 17/28 February 1986
F: 1 July 1987
Schengen Agreement and Convention
S: 14 June 1985/19 June 1990
F: 26 March 1995
Maastricht Treaty (Note: The treaties of Maastricht and Rome form the EU's legal basis, and are also referred to as the Treaty on European Union (TEU) and the Treaty on the Functioning of the European Union (TFEU), respectively. They are amended by secondary treaties.) (Note: Between the EU's founding in 1993 and consolidation in 2009, the union consisted of three pillars, the first of which were the European Communities. The other two pillars consisted of additional areas of cooperation that had been added to the EU's remit.)
S: 7 February 1992
F: 1 November 1993
Amsterdam Treaty
S: 2 October 1997
F: 1 May 1999
Nice Treaty
S: 26 February 2001
F: 1 February 2003
Lisbon Treaty (Note: The consolidation meant that the EU inherited the European Communities' legal personality and that the pillar system was abolished, resulting in the EU framework as such covering all policy areas. Executive/legislative power in each area was instead determined by a distribution of competencies between EU institutions and member states. This distribution, as well as treaty provisions for policy areas in which unanimity is required and qualified majority voting is possible, reflects the depth of EU integration as well as the EU's partly supranational and partly intergovernmental nature.)
S: 13 December 2007
F: 1 December 2009

== See also ==
- Treaties of the European Union
  - Treaty on European Union
  - Treaty on the Functioning of the European Union
