= Three pillars of the European Union =

Legal structure of the European Union from 1993 to 2009

Illustration

Between 1993 and 2009, the European Union (EU) legally comprised three pillars. This structure was introduced with the Maastricht Treaty on 1 November 1993, and was eventually abandoned on 1 December 2009 upon the entry into force of the Treaty of Lisbon, when the EU obtained a consolidated legal personality and a structured distribution of competences.

1. The European Communities pillar handled economic, social and environmental policies. It comprised the European Community (EC), the European Coal and Steel Community (ECSC, until its expiry in 2002), and the European Atomic Energy Community (EURATOM).
2. The Common Foreign and Security Policy (CFSP) pillar took care of foreign policy and military matters.
3. Police and Judicial Co-operation in Criminal Matters (PJCCM) brought together co-operation in the fight against crime. This pillar was originally named Justice and Home Affairs (JHA).

== Overview ==
Within each pillar, a different balance was struck between the supranational and intergovernmental principles.

Supranationalism was strongest in the first pillar. Its function generally corresponded at first to the three European Communities (European Coal and Steel Community (ECSC), European Economic Community (EEC) and Euratom) whose organisational structure had already been unified in 1965–67, through the Merger Treaty. Later, through the Treaty of Maastricht the word "Economic" was removed from the EEC, so it became simply the EC. Then with the Treaty of Amsterdam additional areas would be transferred from the third pillar to the first. In 2002, the ECSC (which had a lifetime of 50 years) ceased to exist because the treaty which established it, the Treaty of Paris, had expired.

In the CFSP and PJCCM pillars the powers of the European Parliament, the Commission and European Court of Justice with respect to the Council were significantly limited, without however being altogether eliminated. The balance struck in the first pillar was frequently referred to as the "community method", since it was that used by the European Community.

=== Pillar I: European Communities (Community integration method) ===
==== European Community (EC) ====
- Customs union and Single market
- Common Agricultural Policy
- Common Fisheries Policy
- EU competition law
- Economic and monetary union
- EU citizenship
- Education and Culture
- Trans-European Networks
- Consumer protection
- Healthcare
- Research (e.g. 7th Framework Programme)
- Environmental law
- Social policy
- Asylum policy
- Schengen treaty
- Immigration policy

==== European Coal and Steel Community (ECSC, until 2002) ====
- Coal and steel industry

==== European Atomic Energy Community (EURATOM) ====
- Nuclear power

=== Pillar II: Common Foreign and Security Policy (Intergovernmental cooperation method) ===
==== Foreign policy ====
- Human rights
- Democracy
- Foreign aid

==== Security policy ====
- Common Security and Defence Policy
- EU battle groups
- Helsinki Headline Goal Force Catalogue
- Peacekeeping

=== Pillar III: Police and Judicial Co-operation in Criminal Matters (Intergovernmental cooperation method) ===
- Drug trafficking and weapons smuggling
- Terrorism
- Trafficking in human beings
- Organised Crime
- Bribery and fraud

== History ==
=== 1993: Origin ===
The pillar structure had its historical origins in the negotiations leading up to the Maastricht Treaty. It was desired to add powers to the Community in the areas of foreign policy, security and defence policy, asylum and immigration policy, criminal co-operation, and judicial co-operation.

However, some member-states opposed the addition of these powers to the Community on the grounds that they were too sensitive to national sovereignty for the community method to be used, and that these matters were better handled intergovernmentally. To the extent that at that time the Community dealt with these matters at all, they were being handled intergovernmentally, principally in European Political Cooperation (EPC).

As a result, these additional matters were not included in the European Community; but were tacked on externally to the European Community in the form of two additional 'pillars'. The first additional pillar (Common Foreign and Security Policy, CFSP) dealt with foreign policy, security and defence issues, while the second additional pillar (JHA, Justice and Home Affairs), dealt with the remainder.

=== 1999 and 2003: Amendments ===
Amendments by the treaty of Amsterdam and the treaty of Nice made the additional pillars increasingly supranational. Most important among these were the transfer of policy on asylum, migration and judicial co-operation in civil matters to the Community pillar, effected by the Amsterdam treaty. Thus the third pillar was renamed Police and Judicial Co-operation in Criminal Matters, or PJCCM. The term Justice and Home Affairs was still used to cover both the third pillar and the transferred areas.

Since the end of World War II, most sovereign European countries have entered into treaties and thereby co-operated and harmonised policies (or pooled sovereignty) in an increasing number of areas, in the European integration project or the construction of Europe (French: la construction européenne). The following timeline outlines the legal inception of the European Union (EU)—the principal framework for this unification. The EU inherited many of its present organisations, institutions, and responsibilities from the European Communities (EC), which were founded in the 1950s in the spirit of the Schuman Declaration.

Legend:
S: signing
F: entry into force
T: termination
E: expiry
de facto supersession
Rel. w/ EC/EU framework:
de facto inside
outside

European Union (EU)
[Cont.]
European Communities (EC)
(Pillar I)

European Atomic Energy Community (EAEC or EURATOM)

[Cont.]

/ / / European Coal and Steel Community (ECSC)

(Distr. of competences)

European Economic Community (EEC)

Schengen Rules
European Community (EC)
TREVI
Justice and Home Affairs (JHA, pillar III)

/ North Atlantic Treaty Organisation (NATO)
[Cont.]
Police and Judicial Co-operation in Criminal Matters (PJCC, pillar III)

Anglo-French alliance
[Defence arm handed to NATO]
European Political Co-operation (EPC)

Common Foreign and Security Policy
(CFSP, pillar II)
Western Union (WU)
/ Western European Union (WEU)
[Tasks defined following the WEU's 1984 reactivation handed to the EU]

[Social, cultural tasks handed to CoE]
[Cont.]

Council of Europe (CoE)
Entente Cordiale
S: 8 April 1904
Dunkirk Treaty (Note: Although not EU treaties per se, these treaties affected the development of the EU defence arm, a main part of the CFSP. The Franco-British alliance established by the Dunkirk Treaty was de facto superseded by WU. The CFSP pillar was bolstered by some of the security structures that had been established within the remit of the 1955 Modified Brussels Treaty (MBT). The Brussels Treaty was terminated in 2011, consequently dissolving the WEU, as the mutual defence clause that the Lisbon Treaty provided for EU was considered to render the WEU superfluous. The EU thus de facto superseded the WEU.)
S: 4 March 1947
F: 8 September 1947
E: 8 September 1997
Brussels Treaty
S: 17 March 1948
F: 25 August 1948
T: 30 June 2011
London and Washington treaties
S: 5 May/4 April 1949
F: 3 August/24 August 1949
Paris treaties: ECSC and EDC (Note: Plans to establish a European Political Community (EPC) were shelved following the French failure to ratify the Treaty establishing the European Defence Community (EDC). The EPC would have combined the ECSC and the EDC.)
S: 18 April 1951/27 May 1952
F: 23 July 1952/?
E: 23 July 2002/—
Protocol Modifying and
Completing the Brussels Treaty
S: 23 October 1954
F: 6 May 1955
Rome treaties: EEC and EAEC
S: 25 March 1957
F: 1 January 1958
WEU-CoE agreement
S: 21 October 1959
F: 1 January 1960
Brussels (Merger) Treaty (Note: The European Communities obtained common institutions and a shared legal personality (i.e. ability to e.g. sign treaties in their own right).)
S: 8 April 1965
F: 1 July 1967
Davignon report
S: 27 October 1970
European Council conclusions
S: 2 December 1975
Single European Act (SEA)
S: 17/28 February 1986
F: 1 July 1987
Schengen Agreement and Convention
S: 14 June 1985/19 June 1990
F: 26 March 1995
Maastricht Treaty (Note: The treaties of Maastricht and Rome form the EU's legal basis, and are also referred to as the Treaty on European Union (TEU) and the Treaty on the Functioning of the European Union (TFEU), respectively. They are amended by secondary treaties.) (Note: Between the EU's founding in 1993 and consolidation in 2009, the union consisted of three pillars, the first of which were the European Communities. The other two pillars consisted of additional areas of cooperation that had been added to the EU's remit.)
S: 7 February 1992
F: 1 November 1993
Amsterdam Treaty
S: 2 October 1997
F: 1 May 1999
Nice Treaty
S: 26 February 2001
F: 1 February 2003
Lisbon Treaty (Note: The consolidation meant that the EU inherited the European Communities' legal personality and that the pillar system was abolished, resulting in the EU framework as such covering all policy areas. Executive/legislative power in each area was instead determined by a distribution of competencies between EU institutions and member states. This distribution, as well as treaty provisions for policy areas in which unanimity is required and qualified majority voting is possible, reflects the depth of EU integration as well as the EU's partly supranational and partly intergovernmental nature.)
S: 13 December 2007
F: 1 December 2009

=== 2009: Abolition ===
In a speech before the Nice Conference, Joschka Fischer, then Foreign Minister of Germany, called for a simplification of the European Union. One of these core ideas was to abolish the pillar structure, and replace it with a merged legal personality for the Union. This idea was included in the Treaty of Lisbon, which entered into force on 1 December 2009. With a legal personality, Union is, for instance, able to be part of international treaties. The Treaty of Lisbon also states that "the Union shall replace and succeed the European Community," with the effect that, once the Treaty entered into force, the EU obtained the membership of the World Trade Organization (WTO) which had belonged to the European Communities pillar.

The abolition of the "3-pillar structure" was welcomed by practitioners and academics who had long considered the 'pillar metaphor" to be unrealistic, if not absurd. The idea that one pillar could be the Communities, while the other two were merely "policies" or "cooperation" was scarcely credible.

In the Lisbon Treaty the distribution of competences in various policy areas between Member States and the Union was reorganised into the following scheme:

Competences of the European Union in relation to those of its member states

Exclusive competence

Shared competence

Supporting competence

The Union has exclusive competence to make directives and conclude international agreements when provided for in a Union legislative act as to …
- the customs union
- the establishing of the competition rules necessary for the functioning of the internal market
- monetary policy for the Member States whose currency is the euro
- the conservation of marine biological resources under the common fisheries policy
- Common Commercial Policy
- conclusion of certain international agreements

Member States cannot exercise competence in areas where the Union has done so, that is …
- the internal market
- social policy, for the aspects defined in TFEU
- economic, social and territorial cohesion
- agriculture and fisheries, excluding the conservation of marine biological resources
- environment
- consumer protection
- transport
- trans-European networks
- energy
- the area of freedom, security and justice
- common safety concerns in public health matters, for the aspects defined in TFEU

Union exercise of competence shall not result in Member States being prevented from exercising theirs in …
- research, technological development and (outer) space
- development cooperation, humanitarian aid

The Union coordinates Member States policies or implements supplemental to their common policies not covered elsewhere in …
- the coordination of economic, employment and social policies
- common foreign, security and defence policies

The Union can carry out actions to support, coordinate or supplement Member States' actions in …
- the protection and improvement of human health
- industry
- culture
- tourism
- education, youth, sport and vocational training
- civil protection (disaster prevention)
- administrative cooperation

== See also ==
- Law of the European Union
- History of the European Union
- Lisbon Treaty abolishes (3) pillars: timeline/events, ( 1993-2009 history )
