= Competences of the European Union =

Aspect of European Union law

The distribution of competences in the European Union is the system by which powers and responsibilities are allocated between the European Union (EU) and its member states. Under the EU's founding treaties, the Union may act only within the limits of competences conferred upon it by the member states, while all remaining powers are retained by the member states.

Upon entry into force in 2009, the Treaty of Lisbon clarified and codified the main categories of Union competence, commonly grouped as exclusive, shared, and supporting, coordinating or supplementing competences (Articles 2–6 of the Treaty on the Functioning of the European Union). This new system replaced the former pillar system.

== Outline ==
Competences of the European Union in relation to those of its member states

Exclusive competence

Shared competence

Supporting competence

The Union has exclusive competence to make directives and conclude international agreements when provided for in a Union legislative act as to …
- the customs union
- the establishing of the competition rules necessary for the functioning of the internal market
- monetary policy for the Member States whose currency is the euro
- the conservation of marine biological resources under the common fisheries policy
- Common Commercial Policy
- conclusion of certain international agreements

Member States cannot exercise competence in areas where the Union has done so, that is …
- the internal market
- social policy, for the aspects defined in TFEU
- economic, social and territorial cohesion
- agriculture and fisheries, excluding the conservation of marine biological resources
- environment
- consumer protection
- transport
- trans-European networks
- energy
- the area of freedom, security and justice
- common safety concerns in public health matters, for the aspects defined in TFEU

Union exercise of competence shall not result in Member States being prevented from exercising theirs in …
- research, technological development and (outer) space
- development cooperation, humanitarian aid

The Union coordinates Member States policies or implements supplemental to their common policies not covered elsewhere in …
- the coordination of economic, employment and social policies
- common foreign, security and defence policies

The Union can carry out actions to support, coordinate or supplement Member States' actions in …
- the protection and improvement of human health
- industry
- culture
- tourism
- education, youth, sport and vocational training
- civil protection (disaster prevention)
- administrative cooperation

== Legal basis ==
The distribution of competences is principally based on the Treaty on European Union (TEU) and the Treaty on the Functioning of the European Union (TFEU). In addition to the principle of conferral, EU action in areas that are not exclusive is governed by the principles of subsidiarity and proportionality.

== Categories of competence ==
The treaties distinguish between different types of competence. A navigational overview of the principal treaty-listed policy areas is provided in the template at the bottom of this article (to avoid duplicating the same lists in the prose).

=== Exclusive competence ===
In areas of exclusive competence, only the EU may legislate and adopt legally binding acts; member states may do so only if empowered by the EU or for the implementation of EU acts (Article 3 TFEU). Examples commonly cited include the customs union and the common commercial policy (trade policy).

=== Shared competence ===
In areas of shared competence, both the EU and member states may legislate. However, member states may exercise their competence only to the extent that the EU has not exercised its own or has chosen to cease exercising it (Article 4 TFEU). Shared competence covers major domains of EU law and policy, including the internal market and environmental policy.

=== Supporting, coordinating or supplementing competence ===
In certain areas, the EU may only support, coordinate or supplement member state action, and may not harmonise national laws in those fields (Article 6 TFEU). This competence is often exercised through non-binding measures (such as recommendations), coordination mechanisms, and funding programmes.

== Principles governing the exercise of competences ==
=== Conferral ===
The EU acts only within competences conferred on it by the member states in the treaties; competences not conferred remain with the member states.

=== Subsidiarity ===
In areas that do not fall within exclusive competence, the EU should act only if the objectives of the proposed action cannot be sufficiently achieved by member states and can be better achieved at Union level.

=== Proportionality ===
EU action must not exceed what is necessary to achieve the objectives of the treaties.

== Flexibility clause ==
Article 352 TFEU (often called the flexibility clause) permits EU action when necessary to attain treaty objectives and where the treaties have not provided the necessary powers, subject to procedural and institutional safeguards.

== See also ==
- Law of the European Union
- Treaties of the European Union
- Subsidiarity (European Union)
- Treaty on European Union
- Treaty on the Functioning of the European Union
