= Double majority =

Type of voting procedure

A double majority is a voting system which requires a majority of votes according to two separate criteria. The mechanism is usually used to require strong support for any measure considered to be of great importance.

Two special cases that technically fit the definition but are usually not considered double majority are double chambers (Note: This is not necessarily true in asymmetric chambers.), where a law must have a majority in two chambers of a legislative body to pass; and quorums, where the measure requires not only a majority but also a turnout minimum.

== Examples in use ==
=== Australia ===
In Australia, constitutional changes must be passed at a referendum in a majority of states (4 of the 6), and by a majority of voters nationally. Prior to 1977, the votes of citizens in the Northern Territory and the ACT did not affect the national or state-based count. After a Constitution Alteration put to referendum in 1977 and given vice-regal assent on 19 July 1977, Territorial votes contribute towards the national majority, but the Territories themselves do not count towards the majority of states. An earlier referendum in 1974, where the same proposed change had been bundled with a lowering of the required number of states to a half (3 of the 6) instead of a majority, had been defeated.

=== Canada ===
Since the patriation of the Canadian constitution in 1982, thorough amending formulae for the constitution were adopted. Per the Constitution Act, 1982, many amendments can be passed only by the Parliament of Canada and a two-thirds majority of the provincial legislatures, those provinces together representing at least 50% of the national population-–this is known as the 7/50 formula (as there were and are 10 provinces, so 7 constitutes a two-thirds majority). Additionally, a province can explicitly choose to dissent to an amendment that "derogates from the legislative powers, the proprietary rights or any other rights or privileges of the legislature or government of a province", in which case it does not apply in that province even if passed. Though not constitutionally mandated, a referendum is also considered to be necessary by some, especially following the precedent established by the Charlottetown Accord in 1992.

However, there are some parts of the constitution that can be modified only by a vote of all the provinces plus the Parliament of Canada; these include changes to the composition of the Supreme Court of Canada, changing the process for amending the constitution itself, or any act affecting the Canadian monarch or Governor General.

=== European Union ===
In the European Union, double majority voting replaced artificial voting weights for votes requiring a qualified majority in the Council of the European Union following implementation of the Treaty of Lisbon. A qualified majority requires 55% of voting EU member states, representing at least 65% of the population of voting members for a European Commission proposal to be approved. This increases to 72% of voting members states, representing at least 65% of the EU population of voting members should the proposal originate from a member state. However, a proposal can only be blocked if a "blocking minority" of at least four Council members representing more than 35% of the EU population is formed. Otherwise the qualified majority shall be deemed attained.

=== Finland ===
Changing the constitution of Finland requires that a simple majority of the sitting Parliament vote in favor of the amendment. The amendment is postponed until the next general election. The next parliament may finally vote to ratify the amendment but by a two thirds of the MPs. Thus, a double majority of two different parliaments is usually required to pass constitutional amendments. An expedited process may however be entered if five sixths of the sitting parliament vote to declare an amendment urgent. Then, a two-thirds majority of the current parliament may ratify an amendment using the expedited process.

=== France ===
The elections to the French National Assembly are conducted in a two-round system. To avoid a runoff, the candidate must win a majority of the votes cast, which also has to be higher than 25% of the number of registered voters in their electoral district.

=== Northern Ireland ===
Under the terms of the Belfast Agreement, if 30 members or more request it, a measure may be put to a "cross-community vote" which requires a majority from both the Nationalist and Unionist camps.

=== Kenya ===
In Kenyan presidential elections, to avoid a runoff, a candidate must win both a majority of votes cast nationwide and at least 25% of the votes in at least half of Kenya's 47 counties (24).

=== Philippines ===
In the 2019 Bangsamoro autonomy plebiscite, for a place to join the Bangsamoro, it is required to have a majority for inclusion both in the place that is petitioning to be included, and from the rest of the larger entity it is originally included. For example, for the six towns from Lanao del Norte petitioning to join, a majority both from the town itself and from the rest of Lanao del Norte should be attained. Each of the six towns overwhelmingly voted for inclusion, but a majority from the rest of Lanao del Norte rejected the towns joining the Bangsamoro, leading to the towns not being included. Meanwhile, 63 of the 67 barangays (villages) in Cotabato voted for inclusion and got consent from their mother towns to join. One barangay rejected inclusion but was allowed by its mother town to join, while three barangays voted for inclusion but were rejected by their mother towns from joining; these four barangays did not join the Bangsamoro. Finally, Isabela City rejected to join, but was allowed by its mother province Basilan to join; it was also not included in the Bangsamoro.

=== Spain ===
For major reforms of the constitution of Spain, a two-thirds majority of the sitting Parliament is required to vote in favor of the amendment. Then, the Parliament is immediately dissolved and snap elections are called, after which the Parliament decides, by majority, whether or not to move on with the amendment. The amendment is then subject to ratification on a referendum. Thus, a double majority of two different parliaments and the people is required to pass major constitutional amendments. Minor amendments, instead, only require a qualified vote (supermajority) in the Parliament, but may be subject to referendum if one-tenth of MPs request so.

=== Switzerland ===
In Switzerland, the passing of a constitutional amendment by popular vote requires a double majority; not only must a majority of people vote for the amendment but a majority of cantons must also give their consent. This is to prevent a larger canton from foisting amendments onto the smaller ones and vice versa.

=== United States ===
In the United States, a constitutional amendment must be passed by a two thirds majority of each house and then ratified by the legislative bodies of three fourths of the states.

On a local level, double majorities are frequently used in municipal annexations, wherein majorities of both the residents in the annexing territory and the territory to be annexed must support the annexation. A similar rule exists for adopting metropolitan government in Tennessee, where the referendum must pass both inside and outside the principal city.
