= Intergovernmentalism =

Concept in international relations

In international relations, intergovernmentalism treats states (and national governments in particular) as the primary actors in the integration process. Intergovernmentalist approaches claim to be able to explain both periods of radical change in the European Union because of converging governmental preferences and periods of inertia because of diverging national interests.

Intergovernmentalism is distinguishable from realism and neorealism because it recognized the significance of institutionalisation in international politics and the impact of domestic politics upon governmental preferences.

== Regional integration ==
=== European integration ===
The best-known example of regional integration is the European Union (EU), an economic and political intergovernmental organisation of 27 member states, all in Europe. The EU operates through a system of supranational independent institutions and intergovernmental negotiated decisions by the member states. Institutions of the EU include the European Commission, the Council of the European Union, the European Council, the Court of Justice of the European Union, the European Central Bank, the Court of Auditors, and the European Parliament. The European Parliament is elected every five years by EU citizens.

The EU has developed a single market through a standardised system of laws that apply in all member states. Within the Schengen Area (which includes 25 EU and 4 non-EU European states) passport controls have been abolished. EU policies favour the free movement of people, goods, services, and capital within its boundaries, enact legislation in justice and home affairs, and maintain common policies on trade, agriculture, fisheries and regional development.

A monetary union, the eurozone, was established in 1999 and is composed of 17 member states. Through the Common Foreign and Security Policy the EU has developed a role in external relations and defence. Permanent diplomatic missions have been established around the world. The EU is represented at the United Nations, the World Trade Organization, the G8 and the G-20.

Intergovernmentalism represents a way for limiting the conferral of powers upon supranational institutions, halting the emergence of common policies. In the current institutional system of the EU, the European Council and the Council play the role of the institutions which have the last word about decisions and policies of the EU, institutionalizing a de facto intergovernmental control over the EU as a whole, with the possibility to give more power to a small group of states. This extreme consequence can create the condition of supremacy of someone over someone else violating the principle of a "Union of Equals". However, from a neo-functionalist viewpoint, some scholars argue that despite the appearance of intergovernmental dominance, the EU's supranational institutions have progressively expanded their influence through spillover effects, which gradually limit member states' control and enhance deeper integration.

=== African integration ===
The African Union (AU, or, in its other official languages, UA) is a continental intergovernmental union, similar but less integrated to the EU, consisting of 54 African states. The AU was presented on 26 May 2001 in Addis Ababa, Ethiopia and officially founded on 9 July 2002 in Durban, South Africa to replace the Organisation of African Unity (OAU). The most important decisions of the AU are made by the Assembly of the African Union, a semi-annual meeting of the heads of state and government of its member states. The AU's secretariat, the African Union Commission, is based in Addis Ababa, Ethiopia.

== See also ==
- Continental Union
- Continentalism
- Functionalism (international relations)
- Intergovernmental organization
- Liberal intergovernmentalism
- Global citizenship
- Neofunctionalism
- Union for the Mediterranean
- Union of South American Nations
