= History of European integration (1948–1957) =

The year 1948 marked the beginning of the institutionalised modern European integration. With the start of the Cold War, the Treaty of Brussels was signed in 1948 establishing the Western Union (WU) as the first organisation. In the same year, the International Authority for the Ruhr and the Organization for European Economic Co-operation, the predecessor of the OECD, were also founded, followed in 1949 by the Council of Europe, and in 1951 by the European Coal and Steel Community, with the ensuing moves to create further communities leading to the Treaty of Rome (1957).

== Beginnings of cooperation ==
With the start of the Cold War, the Treaty of Brussels was signed in 1948 establishing the Western Union (WU). It expanded upon the Dunkirk Treaty which was a military pact between France and the United Kingdom who were concerned about the threat from the USSR following the communist takeover in Czechoslovakia. The new treaty included the Benelux countries and was to promote cooperation not only in military matters but the in economic, social and cultural spheres. These roles however were rapidly taken over by other organisations. Furthermore, in April 1948, the Organization for European Economic Co-operation, the predecessor of the OECD, was also founded to manage the Marshall Plan, triggering as a response the formation of the Comecon for the Soviet-controlled part of Europe. However the signatories of the Brussels treaty quickly realised their common defence was not enough against the USSR. However wider solidarity, such as that seen over the Berlin Blockade in 1949, was seen to provide sufficient deterrent. Hence in 1949 the North Atlantic Treaty Organization (NATO) was created. It expanded the Brussels treaty members to include Denmark, Iceland, Italy, Norway, Portugal as well as Canada and most notably the United States. Military integration in NATO sped up following the first Soviet atomic bomb test and the start of the Korean War which prompted a desire for the inclusion in NATO of West Germany. The ensuing Hague Congress of May 1948 was a pivotal moment in European integration, as it led to the creation of the European Movement International, the College of Europe. In 1948, the Congress of Europe was convened in the Hague, under Winston Churchill's chairmanship. It was the first time all the European unification movements had come together under one roof and attracted a myriad of statesmen including many who would later become known as founding fathers of the European Union. The congress discussed the formation of a new Council of Europe and led to the establishment of the European Movement and the College of Europe. However it exposed a division between unionist (opposed to a loss of sovereignty) and federalist (desiring a federal Europe) supporters. This unionist-federalist divide was reflected in the establishment of the Council of Europe on 5 May 1949 (today its Europe day) It has since been a broad forum to further cooperation and shared issues, achieving for example the European Convention on Human Rights in 1950. The Council was designed with two main political bodies, one composed of governments, the other of national members of parliament. Based in Strasbourg, it is an organisation dealing with democracy and human rights issues (today covering nearly every European state).

In the same year as the Brussels treaty, Sweden planned for a Scandinavian defence union (of Sweden, Denmark and Norway) which would be neutral in regards to the proposed NATO. However, due to pressure from the United States, Norway and Denmark joined NATO and the plans collapsed. A "Scandinavian joint committee for economic cooperation" was established which led to a customs union under the Nordic Council which held its first meeting in 1953. Similar economic activity was taking place between the Benelux countries. The Benelux Customs Union became operative between Belgium, Netherlands and Luxembourg. During the war, the three governments in exile signed a customs convention between their countries. This followed a monetary agreement which fixed their currencies against each other. This integration would lead to an economic union and the countries cooperating in foreign affairs as the union was created out of a desire to strengthen their position as small states. However the Benelux became a precursor and provided ground for later European integration.

== Schuman Declaration and the Treaty of Paris (1951) ==
Founding members of the Community in 1952

Following the Second World War, French government policy aimed to assure disarmament and demilitarization of Germany. The Ruhr region of Germany was a focus as it has historically been key to the country's industrial strength, due to its rich supply of coal and coke which attracted the steel industry, essential for the production of munitions. Initially, France proposed that an international regime control the production and export of coal and steel in the Ruhr.

The start of the cold war changed the context of French policy toward Germany. Further, the U.S. Marshall Plan (the European Recovery Plan) was aimed at reviving the economies of western Europe, including west Germany. To address French concerns, the International Authority for the Ruhr (IAR) was announced at the London Six-Power Conference in June 1948 as part of the plan to establish the Federal Republic of Germany. The IAR would supervise the production, organization, trade and ownership policies of the Ruhr's coal and steel industries, and distribute the industries' products so that Marshall Plan countries would have adequate access to them. The mechanism outlined in the Ruhr Agreement to allocate coal and steel supplies was a council composed of representatives France, the US and the UK (with three votes each), and Belgium, the Netherlands and Luxembourg (with one vote each). The Allied Occupation Zones in Germany would have three votes for its representatives, as soon as it formed a government recognized by the Allies. Following the Petersberg Agreement, that role came to be held by West Germany. The Statute for the IAR was signed and came into effect on April 28, 1949.

In May 1950, the French Foreign Minister Robert Schuman proposed a new strategy: pooling the markets for coal and steel of France, Germany, and other European countries wanting to participate. Schuman's plan was an entirely different approach to the coal and steel issue, as it involved treating the Germans as equals, and with the right to negotiate on the provisions of the plan. Schuman made his announcement on 9 May 1950 (on the basis of a text prepared by Schuman's colleagues Paul Reuter and Bernard Clappier working with Jean Monnet, Pierre Uri and Etienne Hirsch), at the Quai d'Orsay. He proposed that: "Franco-German production of coal and steel as a whole be placed under a common High Authority, within the framework of an organisation open to the participation of the other countries of Europe." Such an act was intended to help economic growth and cement peace between France and Germany, who had previously been longtime enemies. Coal and steel were particular symbolic as they were the resources necessary to wage war. It would also be a first step to a "European federation".

By the signature of this Treaty, the participating Parties give proof of their determination to create the first supranational institution and that thus they are laying the true foundation of an organised Europe. This Europe remains open to all nations. We profoundly hope that other nations will join us in our common endeavour.

— Europe Declaration signed on 18 April 1951 at the Treaty of Paris by Konrad Adenauer (West Germany), Paul van Zeeland, Joseph Meurice (Belgium) Robert Schuman (France) Count Sforza (Italy) Joseph Bech (Luxembourg) and Dirk Stikker, J. R. M. van den Brink (The Netherlands).

The declaration led to the Treaty of Paris (1951) forming the European Coal and Steel Community (ECSC). It was formed by "the inner six": France, Italy, the Benelux countries (Belgium, Netherlands and Luxembourg) together with West Germany. The United Kingdom refused to participate due to a rejection of supranational authority. The Treaty sidestepped the issue of the status of the Saar protectorate. A protocol was attached to the Treaty in the form of an exchange of letters between German Chancellor Adenauer and French Minister of Foreign Affairs Schuman, stating they agreed the Treaty would have no bearing on their views of the status of the Saar. The Treaty was ratified by the middle of 1952, and the European Coal and Steel Community agreement entered into force on 23 July 1952. Agreement to terminate the IAR came into force on 25 June 1952. The common market was opened on 10 February 1953 for coal, and on 1 May 1953 for steel.

During the existence of the ECSC, steel production would improve and increase fourfold. Coal production however would decline but its technology, safety and environmental quality would improve. ECSC helped deal with crises in the industry and ensured balanced development and distribution of resources. However the treaty, unlike its successors, was designed to expire after 50 years.

In 1954 by the Treaty of Brussels was transformed by the Paris Agreements into the Modified Brussels Treaty which created the Western European Union which would take on European defence and be merged into the EU in later decades. transformed the Western Union into the Western European Union (WEU). West Germany eventually joined in 1955 both WEU and NATO, prompting the Soviet Union to form the Warsaw Pact in 1955 as an institutional framework for its military domination in the countries of Central and Eastern Europe.

=== First community ===
With the Treaty of Paris, the European Coal and Steel Community was created. At its centre was the High Authority (the forerunner to today's European Commission), which served as the Community's executive. The first president was Jean Monnet. The President was elected by the eight other members. The nine members were appointed by the member states (two for France, Italy and West Germany, one for Belgium, Luxembourg and the Netherlands). They were expected to not represent their member states, but rather the common interest.

The member states' governments were represented by the Council of Ministers, the Presidency of which rotated between each state every three months in alphabetical order. It was added at the request of smaller states, fearing undue influence from the High Authority. Its task was to harmonise the work of national governments with the acts of the High Authority, as well as issue opinions on the work of the Authority when needed. Hence, unlike the modern Council, this body had limited powers as issues relating only to coal and steel were in the Authority's domain, whereas the Council only had to give its consent to decisions outside coal and steel. As a whole, it only scrutinised and advised the executive which was independent.

The Common Assembly, what is now the European Parliament, was composed of 78 representatives. The Assembly exercised supervisory powers over the executive. The representatives were to be national MPs elected by their Parliaments to the Assembly, or directly elected. Though in practice it was the former as there was no requirement until the Treaties of Rome and no election until 1979. However, to emphasise that the chamber was not to be that of a traditional international organisation, whereby it would be composed of representatives of national governments, the Treaty of Paris used the term "representatives of the peoples". The Assembly was not originally mentioned in the Schuman Declaration but put forward by Jean Monnet on the second day of treaty negotiations. It was still hoped that the Assembly of the Council of Europe would be the active body and the supranational Community would be inserted inside as one of the Council's institutions. The assembly was intended as a democratic counter-weight and check to the High Authority. It had formal powers to sack the High Authority, following investigation of abuse.

The Court of Justice was to ensure the observation of ECSC law along with the interpretation and application of the Treaty. The Court was composed of seven judges, appointed by common accord of the national governments for six years. There were no requirements that the judges had to be of a certain nationality, simply that they be qualified and that their independence be beyond doubt. The Court was assisted by two Advocates General.

Finally, there was a Consultative Committee (the forerunner to what is now the Economic and Social Committee) which had between 30 and 50 members, equally divided between producers, workers, consumers and dealers in the coal and steel sector. This grouping provided a chamber of professional associations for civil society and was in permanent dialogue with the High Authority on policy and proposals for legislation. Its Opinions were necessary before such action could take place. The threefold division of its members prevented any one group, whether business, labour or consumers, from dominating proceedings, as majority voting was required. Its existence curtailed the activity of lobbyists acting to influence governments on such policy. The Consultative Committee had an important action in controlling the budget and expenditures, drawn from the first European tax on coal and steel producers. The Community money was spent on re-employment and social housing activities within the sectors concerned.

Members were appointed for two years and were not bound by any mandate or instruction of the organisations which appointed them. The Committee had a plenary assembly, bureau and a president. The High Authority was obliged to consult the committee in certain cases where it was appropriate and to keep it informed.

=== Provisional seats ===
The Treaty made no decision on where to base the institutions of the new community. The Treaty allowed for the seat(s) to be decided by common accord of governments yet at a conference of the ECSC members on 23 July 1952 no permanent seat was decided. The seat was contested with Liège, Luxembourg, Strasbourg and Turin all considered. While Saarbrücken had a status as a "European city", the ongoing dispute over Saarland made it a problematic choice. Brussels would have been accepted at the time, but divisions within the then-unstable Belgian government ruled that option out.

To break the deadlock, Joseph Bech, then Prime Minister of Luxembourg, proposed that Luxembourg be made the provisional seat of the institutions until a permanent agreement was reached. However, it was decided that the Common Assembly (the forerunner to the European Parliament), should instead be based in Strasbourg—the Council of Europe (CoE) was already based there, in the House of Europe. The chamber of the CoE's Parliamentary Assembly could also serve the Common Assembly, and it did so until 1999, when a new complex of buildings was built across the river from the Palace.

== Development of new Communities ==
The Council of Europe adopted a flag to symbolise Europe.

Following on the heels of the creation of the ECSC, the European Defence Community (EDC) was drawn up and signed on 27 May 1952. It would combine national armies and allow West Germany to rearm under the control of the new Community. However, in 1954, the treaty was rejected by the French National Assembly. The rejection also derailed further plans for a European Political Community, being drawn up by members of the Common Assembly which would have created a federation to ensure democratic control over the future European army. In 1955, the Council of Europe adopted an emblem for all Europe, twelve golden stars in a circle upon a blue field. It would later be adopted by the European Communities.

In 1956, the Egyptian government under Gamal Abdel Nasser nationalised the Suez Canal and closing it to Israeli traffic, sparking the Suez Crisis. This was in response to the withdrawal of funding for the Aswan Dam by the UK and United States due to Egypt's ties to the Soviet Union. The canal was owned by the UK and French investors and had been a neutral zone under British control. The nationalisation and closure to Israeli traffic prompted a military response by the UK, France and Israel, a move opposed by the United States. It was a military success but a political disaster for the UK and France. The UK in particular saw it could not operate alone, instead turning to the US, and it also prompted the next British Prime Minister, Harold Macmillan, to look towards joining the European Community. Equally France saw its future with the Community but opposed British entry, with then French President Charles de Gaulle stating he would veto British entry out of a fear it would lead to US domination.

As a result of the crisis, the Common Assembly proposed extending the powers of the ECSC to cover other sources of energy. Louis Armand was put in charge of a study into the prospects of nuclear energy use in Europe. The report concluded further nuclear development was needed to fill the deficit left by the exhaustion of coal deposits and to reduce dependence on oil producers. However the Benelux states and Germany were also keen on creating a general common market, although it was opposed by France. In the end, both were created, as separate communities.

As a result of the Messina Conference of 1955, Paul-Henri Spaak was appointed as chairman of a preparatory committee (Spaak Committee) charged with the preparation of a report on the creation of a common European market.

The Spaak Report drawn up by the Spaak Committee provided the basis for further progress and was accepted at the Venice Conference (29 and 30 May 1956) where the decision was taken to organize an Intergovernmental Conference. The report formed the cornerstone of the Intergovernmental Conference on the Common Market and Euratom at Val Duchesse in 1956. The outcome of the conference was that new communities would share the Common Assembly (now Parliamentary Assembly) with the ECSC, as it would with the Court of Justice. However they would not share the ECSC's Council of High Authority. The two new High Authorities would be called Commissions, this was due to a reduction in their powers. France was reluctant to agree to more supranational powers and hence the new Commissions would only have basic powers and important decisions would have to be approved by the Council, which now adopted majority voting. Thus, on 25 March 1957, the Treaties of Rome were signed. They came into force on 1958-01-01 establishing the European Economic Community (EEC) and the European Atomic Energy Community (Euratom). The latter body fostered co-operation in the nuclear field, at the time a very popular area, and the EEC was to create a full customs union between members. Louis Armand became the first President of Euratom Commission and Walter Hallstein became the first President of the EEC Commission.

== See also ==
- History of the European Communities (1973–1993)
- History of the European Union (2004–present)
- Organisation for European Economic Cooperation
- Hungarian Revolution of 1956
- European Youth Campaign
