= Noordwijk Conference =

International conference on space law and space policy

The Noordwijk Conference was held in Noordwijk, near The Hague, on 6 September 1955 to evaluate the progress made by the Spaak Committee set up by the Messina Conference. The conference was attended by the Foreign Ministers of the six Member States of the European Coal and Steel Community (ECSC). Chairman of the conference was Johan Willem Beyen, then Netherlands Minister for Foreign Affairs.

At the conference Paul-Henri Spaak presented an interim report of the Spaak Committee so the attendants could evaluate the progress made in the technical activities of the committee. Spaak informed his colleagues of the difficulties on transport and conventional energy (coal, oil) and paid attention also to agricultural issues. As a result, Spaak requested two more months in order to prepare his final report. Although progress had been made, the press release lead to the conclusion that the committee had run into an impasse.

== See also ==
- Messina Conference
- Venice Conference

== Sources ==
- The Noordwijk Conference
- 'M. Spaak parle des entretiens de Noordwijk' dans La Métropole (9 September 1955)
