= Russell Frederick Bretherton =

Economist and Civil Servant

Photo of Russell Frederick Bretherton

Russell Frederick Bretherton, CB (3 February 1906 – 11 January 1991), was a British economist, civil servant and amateur entomologist, particularly noted for his membership of the Spaak Committee in 1955.

== Career up to 1955 ==
Born in Gloucester in 1906 and educated at Clifton College, Russell Frederick Bretherton went to Wadham College, Oxford, as a history scholar in 1923. A First in History was followed by a First in Philosophy, Politics, and Economics (PPE), and the Webb Medley Scholarship, the major university award open to a budding economist. Elected a fellow of Wadham in 1928 he was Tutor in Economics until 1939. (Harold Wilson was one of his pupils.) His major work was "Public Investment and the Trade Cycle", written with F. A. Burchardt and S. G. Rutherford and published in 1941. Partly overtaken by the war the volume was nevertheless widely received as a model of its kind which would exert a salutary influence on public policy for years to come. At the start of the Second World War, Bretherton was drafted into the Ministry of Supply as a temporary Civil Servant, and pursued a Whitehall career thereafter. In 1949 he was at the centre of the sterling crisis which led to the major devaluation of the pound. In 1955 he was an Under Secretary at the Board of Trade.

== Events leading up to the Spaak Committee ==
At the time of the negotiations which eventually led to the Treaty of Rome in 1957, the UK Government was opposed to propositions which involved submerging any part of its sovereignty in new European political institutions. The UK had already declined to become a member of the European Coal and Steel Community (ECSC), and had been unenthusiastic about the proposed European Defence Community.

Consequently, and contrary to many subsequent incorrect reports, the UK was not represented at the Messina Conference in June 1955. At that meeting the Benelux members of the ECSC represented at Foreign Minister level argued that: "it is necessary to work for the establishment of a united Europe by the development of common institutions, the gradual fusion of national economies, the creation of a common market and the gradual harmonisation of … social policies." At the end of the conference a committee was set up under the Chairmanship of the Belgian Foreign Minister Paul-Henri Spaak, to further these studies. The UK government was invited to join in the discussions but, given that it was not looking for a positive outcome, appointed as their representative not a politician, but a trade economist and civil servant, Russell Bretherton.

== Misrepresentation of Bretherton's views ==
Bretherton soon realised that the Spaak Committee was not just trade related but was, on the contrary, highly political. However, when it eventually became clear in November 1955 that the UK could contribute nothing more to the discussions, it was subsequently alleged by a member of the French delegation, J. F. Deniau, and frequently repeated in various slightly different versions, that Bretherton, prior to leaving the meeting for the last time, declared "Gentleman, you are trying to negotiate something you will never be able to negotiate. But, if negotiated, it will not be ratified. And if ratified, it will not work. Au revoir et bonne chance." When these alleged remarks were quoted by the then President of the European Commission, Jacques Delors, in late 1991 as illustrating the current attitudes of the British Government they were widely covered in the British press, e.g. "The Bretherton syndrome of 'Britain knows best'". The alleged remarks were subsequently repeated in print, on TV and on the radio on numerous occasions, including a BBC Radio 4 series broadcast in August 2006. The Economist's Special Report on Britain in its edition of 9 November 2013 continues the misrepresentation under the heading 'Europe – Channel deep and wide' – rebutted in the letters section of the edition of 30 November 2013.

== Bretherton's actual views on the work of the Spaak Committee ==
Compared with Deniau's account, the reality was quite different. Bretherton's views as the Spaak Committee progressed are set out in a series of reports which are now to be found in the National Archives at Kew. The key point, he wrote in August 1955, was: "We have, in fact, the power to guide the conclusions of this conference in almost any direction we like, but beyond a certain point we cannot exercise that power without ourselves becoming, in some measure, responsible for the results". Furthermore, as he subsequently said to Michael Charlton: "If we had been able to say that we agreed in principle, we could have got whatever kind of common Market we wanted. I have no doubt of that at all." When Michael Charlton interviewed the then President of the Board of Trade, Sir Peter Thorneycroft, he commented "...he [Bretherton] was sent there with a brief not to commit this country to anything, which was the Cabinet's decision. One can't place any responsibility on Mr Bretherton's shoulders. He was a keen European and one of the most brilliant officials I've ever had the privilege of working with". A detailed account of these momentous events can be found in Miriam Camps' 'Britain and the European Community 1955–1963' and some have subsequently argued that the Spaak Committee was the greatest missed opportunity of the UK's post-war history. On the other hand, the views erroneously attributed to Bretherton by Deniau were a fair representation of the views of the UK Government at the time. They would not have been so frequently repeated otherwise.

== Bretherton's subsequent career ==
Once the Spaak Committee had led on to the Treaty of Rome, Bretherton was with others put on to working up the European Free Trade Area (EFTA) as a counterweight to the six members of the European Economic Community. But he himself knew that EFTA was never more than a poor second best.

Bretherton moved to the Treasury in 1961, and retired in 1968.

== Entomology ==
Bretherton was also a distinguished amateur entomologist who published more than 200 articles in the Journal of the British Entomology and Natural History Society, of which he was President in 1967–68 and subsequently Treasurer for a number of years. His collections can be viewed at the Reading Museum and the Entomology and Natural History Society's building at Dinton Pastures Country Park.
