= San Giorgio Monastery =

Benedictine monastery in Venice, Italy

Coordinates: 45.4295096°N 12.3436975°E

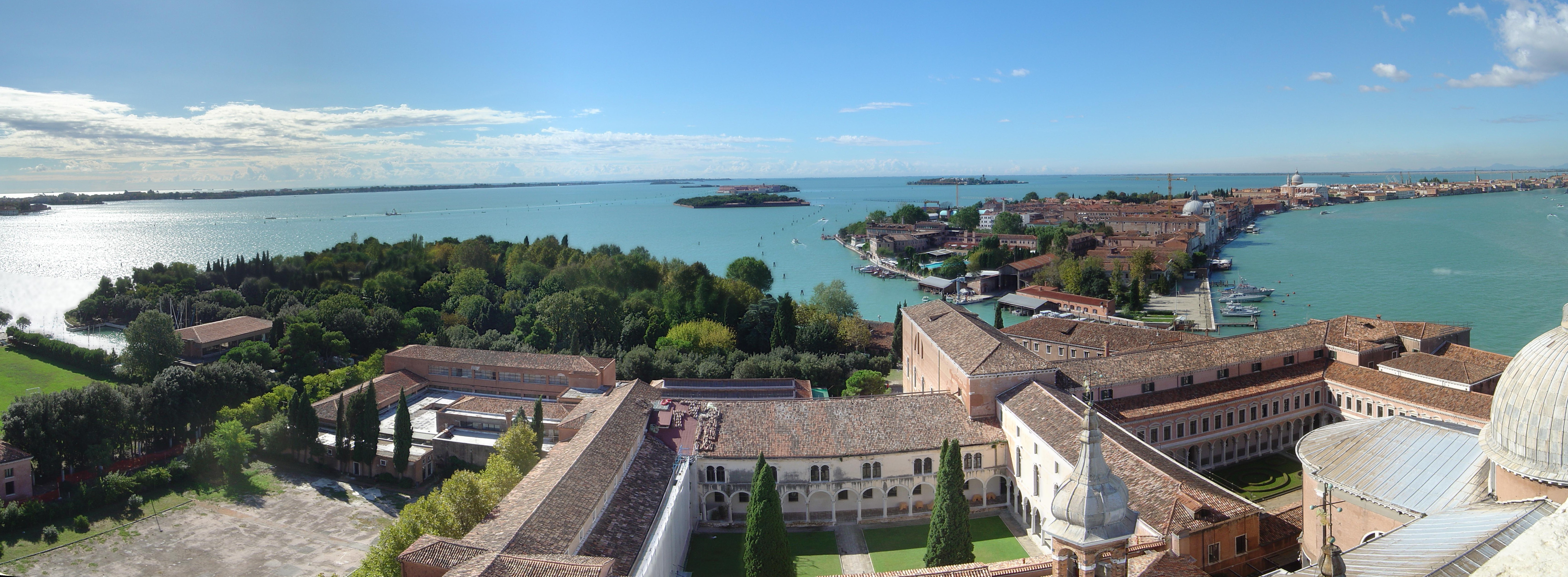
View of the Monastery of San Giorgio Maggiore from the bell tower

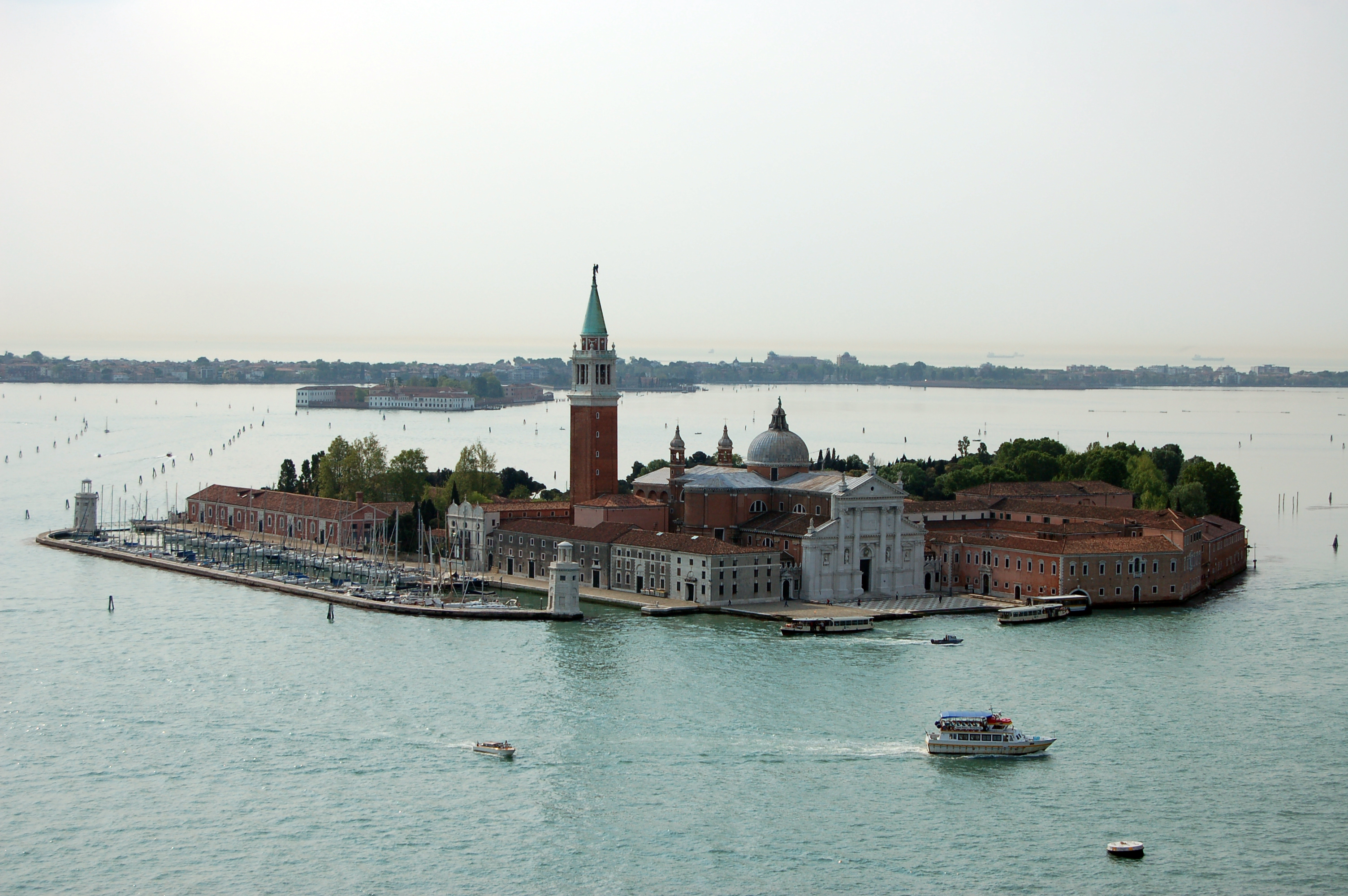
View of the island

The San Giorgio Monastery (St. George Monastery) is a Benedictine monastery in Venice, Italy, located on the island of San Giorgio Maggiore. It stands next to the Church of San Giorgio Maggiore, which serves the monastic community. Most of the old monastic buildings currently serve as headquarters of the Cini Foundation.

== History of the monastery ==
=== Foundation ===
The monastery was founded in AD 982 following the donation of the island by the Doge Tribuno Memmo in response to a request by the Blessed John Morosini, O.S.B., who wished to establish a monastery there, and who then became the first abbot. Among the first monks of the community which developed there was St. Gerard of Csanád (Hungarian: Szent Gellért) (980-1046), a bishop and martyr who helped establish Christianity in Hungary. He was murdered in Budapest—on the hill which now bears his name—in the course of a pagan insurrection against the Venetian king then ruling the Hungarians.

=== Prestige ===
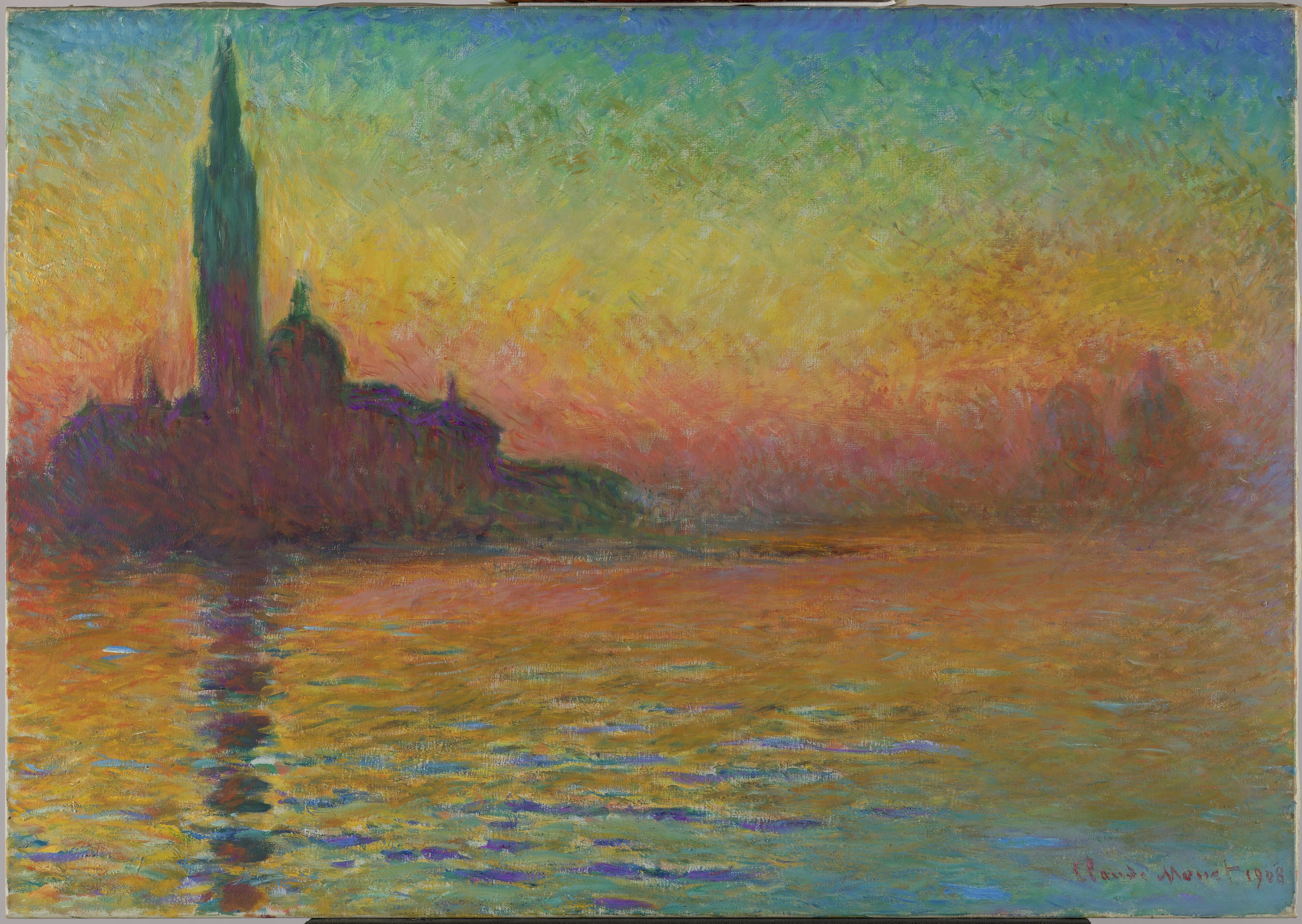
San Giorgio Maggiore at Dusk, Claude Monet, 1908–1912

Over the centuries the monastery became a theological, cultural and artistic center of primary importance in Europe. The monks had considerable autonomy and close links with Florence and Padua, and thus it became also a favoured location for foreign dignitaries to stay while in the city. In 1177 Pope Alexander III and Frederick Barbarossa met here. In 1204, Doge Enrico Dandolo secured the relics of Saint Lucy for the monastery; they were transferred in 1279 to Santa Lucia in Cannaregio.

In 1223 a violent earthquake destroyed the monastery. In 1433 Cosimo de' Medici, when exiled from Florence, took refuge here. Between 1560 and 1562 Andrea Palladio built a new refectory for which Paolo Veronese painted the massive The Wedding Feast at Cana which was displayed there. In 1566 began the construction of the new church by Palladio, who later also designed the "Palladian" cloister. Between 1641 and 1680 Baldassarre Longhena designed the new library, the grand staircase, the monastery facade, the novitiate, the infirmary and the guest quarters.

After the fall of the Venetian Republic in 1797, the monastery was deprived of its most precious books and works of art. Napoleon sent The Wedding Feast at Cana to Paris, and at present it is displayed in the Louvre museum. It is now possible, however, to admire a copy in the refectory which hangs in the place for which the painting was originally created.

The monastery was so important that, in 1799, while Rome was occupied by the French Revolutionary Army, the Papal conclave which elected Pope Pius VII was convened there. The cardinals met in the chorum nocturnis (or Night choir), where the remarkable canvas Saint George Slaying the Dragon by Vittore Carpaccio is still displayed.

=== The decline ===
Nevertheless, in 1806 the monastery was suppressed and the monks expelled; many of the monastery's remaining treasures were sold or stolen. Only a few monks were able to remain to serve in the church, while the monastery itself became a weapons depot. For more than a century it was used as a military garrison, undergoing grave deterioration.

== Revival ==
In 1951 the Italian Government granted the monastery to the Cini Foundation, which restored it and revived its cultural heritage. On 29–30 May 1956 the Venice Conference of the Foreign Ministers of the six Member States of the European Coal and Steel Community (ECSC) was held in the San Giorgio Monastery to discuss the Spaak Report of the Spaak Committee.

The old and smaller monastic buildings to the left and rear of the basilica still serve as a small monastery of Benedictine monks, who continue to offer hospitality as part of their mission.

== See also ==
- John Morosini

== Sources ==
- World Congress of Environmental and Resource Economists - San Giorgio Maggiore
- Guida d’Italia del Touring Club Italiano – Venezia. 3° ed. ISBN 978-88-365-4347-2
- S. Vianello (a cura di) Le chiese di Venezia. Electa, 1993 ISBN 88-435-4048-3
