= The Wedding at Cana (Veronese) =

Painting by Paolo Veronese

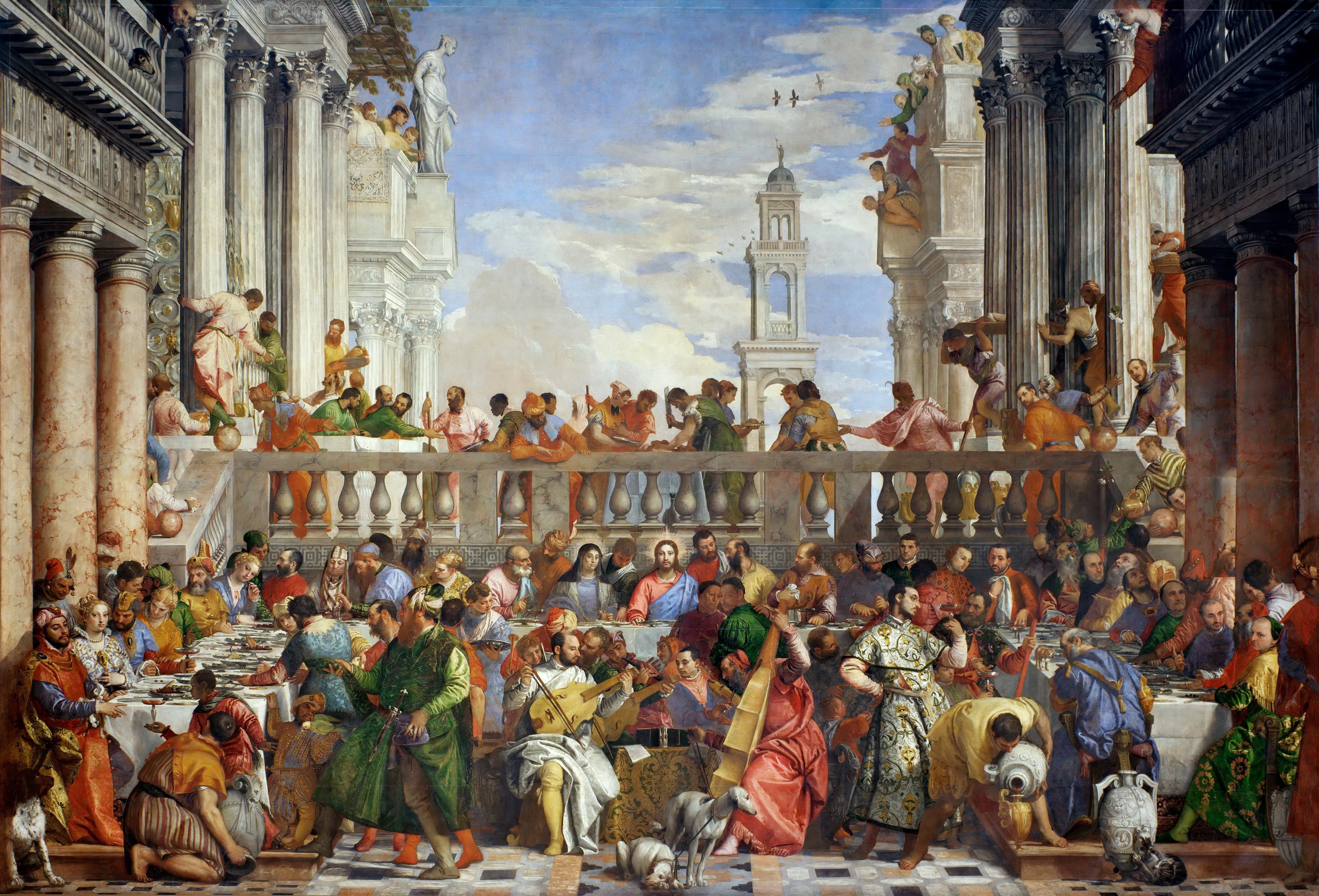
- Artist: Paolo Veronese
- Year: 1563
- Medium: Oil on canvas
- Dimensions: 6.77 m × 9.94 m (267 in × 391 in)
- Location: Louvre, Paris

The Wedding at Cana (Italian: Nozze di Cana, 1562–1563), by Paolo Veronese, is a representational painting that depicts the biblical story of the Wedding at Cana, at which Jesus miraculously converts water into red wine (John 2:1–11). Executed in the Mannerist style (1520–1600) of the late Renaissance, the large-format (6.77 m × 9.94 m or 22 ft 3 in × 32 ft 7 in) oil painting comprehends the stylistic ideal of compositional harmony, as practised by the artists Leonardo, Raphael, and Michelangelo.

The art of the High Renaissance (1490–1527) emphasised human figures of ideal proportions, balanced composition, and beauty, whereas Mannerism exaggerated the Renaissance ideals – of figure, light, and colour – with asymmetric and unnaturally elegant arrangements achieved by flattening the pictorial space and distorting the human figure as an ideal preconception of the subject, rather than as a realistic representation. The visual tension among the elements of the picture and the thematic instability among the human figures in The Wedding Feast at Cana derive from Veronese's application of technical artifice, the inclusion of sophisticated cultural codes and symbolism (social, religious, theologic), which present a biblical story relevant to the Renaissance viewer and to the contemporary viewer.

From the 16th to the 18th centuries, the painting hung in the refectory of the San Giorgio Monastery. In 1797, soldiers of Napoleon's Army of Italy plundered the picture as war booty during the Italian campaigns of the French Revolutionary Wars (1792–1802). The pictorial area (67.29 m^{2}) of the canvas makes The Wedding Feast at Cana the most expansive picture in the paintings collection of the Musée du Louvre.

== History ==
=== The commission ===
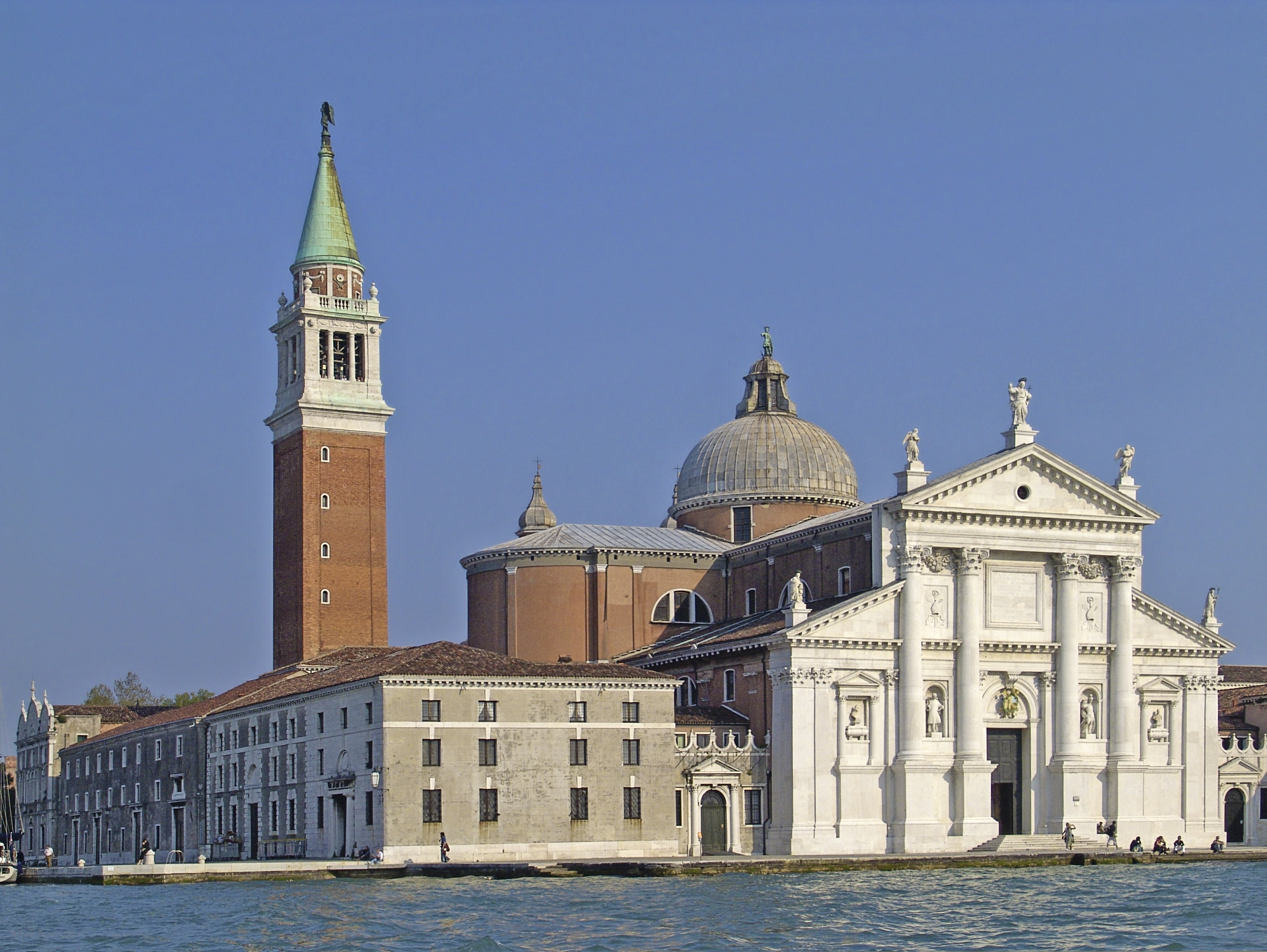
In 1562, the Benedictine monks commissioned Paolo Veronese to realise The Wedding Feast at Cana as a monumental painting (6.77 m × 9.94 m) to occupy the back wall of the monastery's refectory, at the San Giorgio Monastery, Venice.

At Venice, on 6 June 1562, the Black Monks of the Order of Saint Benedict (OSB) commissioned Paolo Veronese to realise a monumental painting (6.77 m ×× 9.94 m) to decorate the far wall of the monastery's new refectory, designed by the architect Andrea Palladio, at the San Giorgio Monastery, on the eponymous island. In their business contract for the commission of The Wedding Feast at Cana, the Benedictine monks stipulated that Veronese be paid 324 ducats; be paid the costs of his personal and domestic maintenance; be provided a barrel of wine; and be fed in the refectory.

Aesthetically, the Benedictine contract stipulated that the painter represent “the history of the banquet of Christ’s miracle at Cana, in Galilee, creating the number of [human] figures that can be fully accommodated”, and that he use optimi colori (the best colours) – specifically, the colour ultramarine, a deep-blue pigment made from lapis lazuli, a semi-precious, metamorphic rock. Assisted by his brother, Benedetto Caliari, Veronese delivered the completed painting in September 1563, in time for the Festa della Madonna della Salute, in November.

=== Composition and technique ===
In the 17th century, during the mid–1630s, supporters of Andrea Sacchi (1599–1661) and supporters of Pietro da Cortona (1596–1669) argued much about the ideal number of human figures for a representational composition. Sacchi said that only a few figures (fewer than 12) permit the artist to honestly depict the unique body poses and facial expressions that communicate character; while da Cortona said that many human figures consolidate the general image of a painting into an epic subject from which sub-themes would develop. In the 18th century, in Seven Discourses on Art, the portraitist Joshua Reynolds (1723–1792) said that:

The subjects of the Venetian painters are mostly such as gave them an opportunity of introducing a great number of figures, such as feasts, marriages, and processions, public martyrdoms, or miracles. I can easily conceive that [Paolo] Veronese, if he were asked, would say that no subject was proper for an historical picture, but such as admitted at least forty figures; for in a less number, he would assert, there could be no opportunity of the painter's showing his art in composition, his dexterity of managing and disposing the masses of light, and groups of figures, and of introducing a variety of Eastern dresses and characters in their rich stuffs.

As a narrative painting in the Mannerist style, The Wedding Feast at Cana combines stylistic and pictorial elements from the Venetian school's philosophy of colorito (priority of colour) of Titian (1488–1576) to the compositional disegno (drawing) of the High Renaissance (1490–1527) used in the works of Leonardo (1452–1519), Raphael (1483–1520), and Michelangelo (1475–1564). As such, Veronese's depiction of the crowded banquet-scene that is The Wedding Feast at Cana is meant to be viewed upwards, from below – because the painting's bottom-edge was 2.50 metres from the refectory floor, behind and above the head-table seat of the abbot of the monastery.

As stipulated in the Benedictine contract for the painting, the canvas of monumental dimensions (6.77m x 9.94m) and area (67.29m^{2}) was to occupy the entire display-wall in the refectory. In the 16th century, Palladio's great-scale design was Classically austere; the monastery dining-room featured a vestibule with a large door, and then stairs that led to a narrow ante-chamber, where the entry door to the refectory was flanked by two marble lavabos, for diners to cleanse themselves; the interior of the refectory featured barrel vaults and groin vaults, rectangular windows, and a cornice. In practice, Veronese's artistic prowess with perspective and architecture (actual and virtual) persuaded the viewer to see The Wedding Feast at Cana as a spatial extension of the refectory.

== Subject ==
In The Wedding Feast at Cana, Veronese represents the water-into-wine miracle of Jesus in the grand style of the sumptuous feasts of food and music that were characteristic of 16th-century Venetian society; the sacred in and among the profane world where “banquet dishes not only signify wealth, power, and sophistication, but transfer those properties directly into the individual diner. An exquisite dish makes the eater exquisite.”

=== Banquet ===
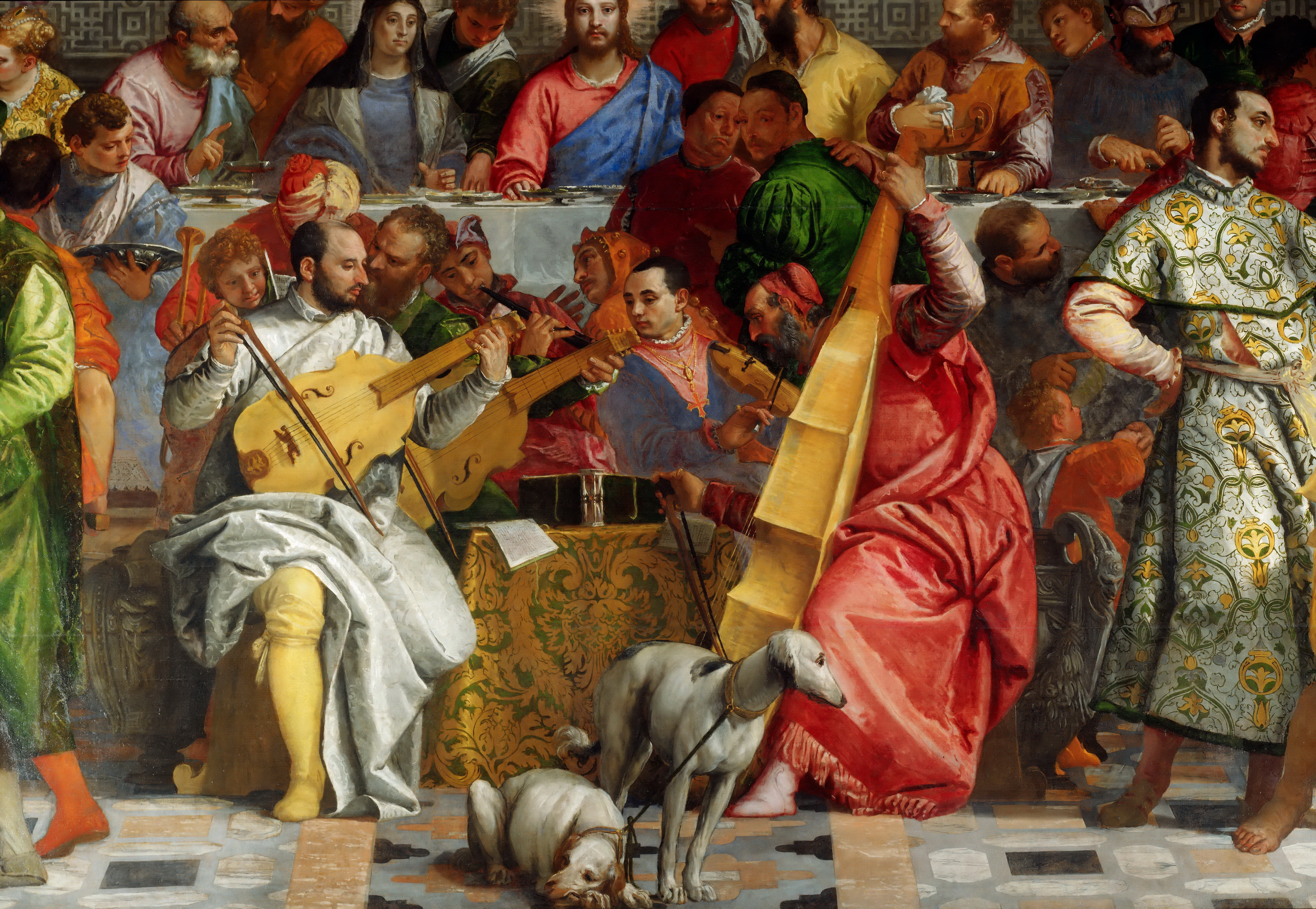
The musicians providing ambience for The Wedding Feast at Cana are personified by Veronese (viola da braccio), and the principal painters of the Venetian school: Jacopo Bassano (cornetto), Tintoretto (viola da braccio) and Titian (violone); standing beside Titian is the poet Pietro Aretino. (detail, lower centre-plane)

The wedding banquet is framed with Greek and Roman architecture from Classical Antiquity and with architecture of the Renaissance, Veronese's contemporary era. The Graeco-Roman architecture features Doric order and Corinthian order columns surrounding a courtyard that is enclosed with a low balustrade; in the distance, beyond the courtyard, there is an arcaded tower, by the architect Andrea Palladio. In the foreground, musicians play stringed instruments of the Late–Renaissance, such as the lute, the violone, and the viola da gamba.

Among the wedding guests are historical personages, such as the monarchs Eleanor of Austria, Francis I of France, and Mary I of England, Suleiman the Magnificent, tenth sultan of the Ottoman Empire, and the Holy Roman Emperor Charles V; the poetess Vittoria Colonna, the diplomat Marcantonio Barbaro, and the architect Daniele Barbaro; the noblewoman Giulia Gonzaga and Cardinal Pole, the last Roman Catholic Archbishop of Canterbury, the master jester Triboulet and the Ottoman statesman Sokollu Mehmet Paşa – all dressed in the sumptuous Occidental and Oriental fashions alla Turca popular in the Renaissance.

According to 17th-century legend and artistic tradition, the painter of the picture (Paolo Veronese) included himself in the banquet scene, as the musician in a white tunic, who is playing a viola da braccio. Accompanying Veronese are the principal painters of the Venetian school: Jacopo Bassano, playing the cornetto, Tintoretto, also playing a viola da braccio, and Titian, dressed in red, playing the violone; besides them stands the poet Pietro Aretino considering a glass of the new red wine. A more recent study links the identity of the performer seated behind Veronese playing viola da gamba with Diego Ortiz, musical theorist and then chapell master at the court of Naples.

=== Symbolism ===
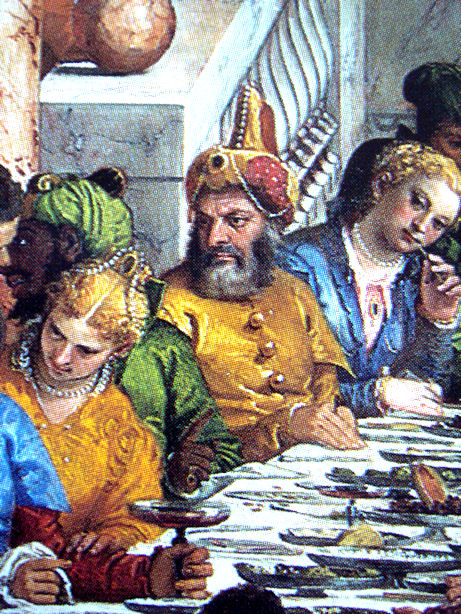
In The Wedding Feast at Cana, Veronese shows the sated guests at the nuptial banquet-table awaiting the dessert-course wine service. The guests awaiting the new, red wine include Suleiman the Magnificent, an elegant woman discreetly cleaning her teeth with a toothpick, and a woman urging her husband to ask the bride about the new red wine they have been served. (detail, left lower-quarter)

The Wedding Feast at Cana is a painting of the Early Modern period (1453–1789); the religious and theological narrative of Veronese's interpretation of the water-into-wine miracle is in two parts.

I. On the horizontal axis – the lower-half of the painting contains 130 human figures; the upper-half of the painting is dominated by a cloudy sky and Graeco-Roman architecture, which frames and contains the historical figures and Late-Renaissance personages invited to celebrate the bride and bridegroom at their wedding feast. Some human figures are rendered in foreshortened perspective, the stylisation of Mannerism; the old architecture mirrors the contemporary architecture of Andrea Palladio; the narrative treatment places the religious subject in a cosmopolitan tableau of historical and contemporary personages, most of whom are fashionably dressed in costumes from the Orient — Asia as known to Renaissance society in the 16th century.

Seated behind and above the musicians are the Virgin Mary, Jesus of Nazareth, and some of his Apostles. Above the figure of Jesus, on an elevated walkway, a man watches the banquet, and a serving maid waits for the carver to carve an animal to portions. To the right, a porter arrives with more meat for the feasting diners to eat. The alignment of the Jesus figure under the carver's blade and block, and the butchered animals, prefigure his sacrifice as the Lamb of God.

bottom-right-quarter – a barefoot wine-servant pours the new, red wine into a serving ewer, from a large, ornate oenochoe, which earlier had been filled with water. Behind the wine servant stands the poet Pietro Aretino, intently considering the red wine in his glass.

bottom-left-quarter – the steward of the house (dressed in green) supervises the black servant-boy proffering a glass of the new, red wine to the bridegroom, the host of the wedding feast; at the edge of the nuptial table, a dwarf holds a bright-green parrot, and awaits instructions from the house steward.

II. On the vertical axis – the contrasts of light and shadow symbolise the co-existence of mortality and vanitas, the transitory pleasures of earthly life; the protocol of religious symbolism supersedes the social protocol.

In the wedding banquet proper, the holy guests and the mortal hosts have exchanged their social status, and so Jesus, the Virgin Mary, and some of his Apostles, are seated in the place of honour of the centre-span of the banquet table, whilst the bride and bridegroom sit, as guests, at the far end of the table's right wing. Above the Jesus figure, a carver is carving a lamb, beneath the Jesus figure, musicians play lively music, yet, before them is an hourglass – a reference to the futility of human vanity. Moreover, despite the kitchen's continuing preparation of roasted meat, the main course of a celebratory meal, the wedding guests are eating the dessert course, which includes fruit and nuts, wine and sweet quince cheese (symbolically edible marriage); that contradiction, between kitchen and diners, indicates that the animals are symbolic and not for eating.

== Plunder and repatriation ==
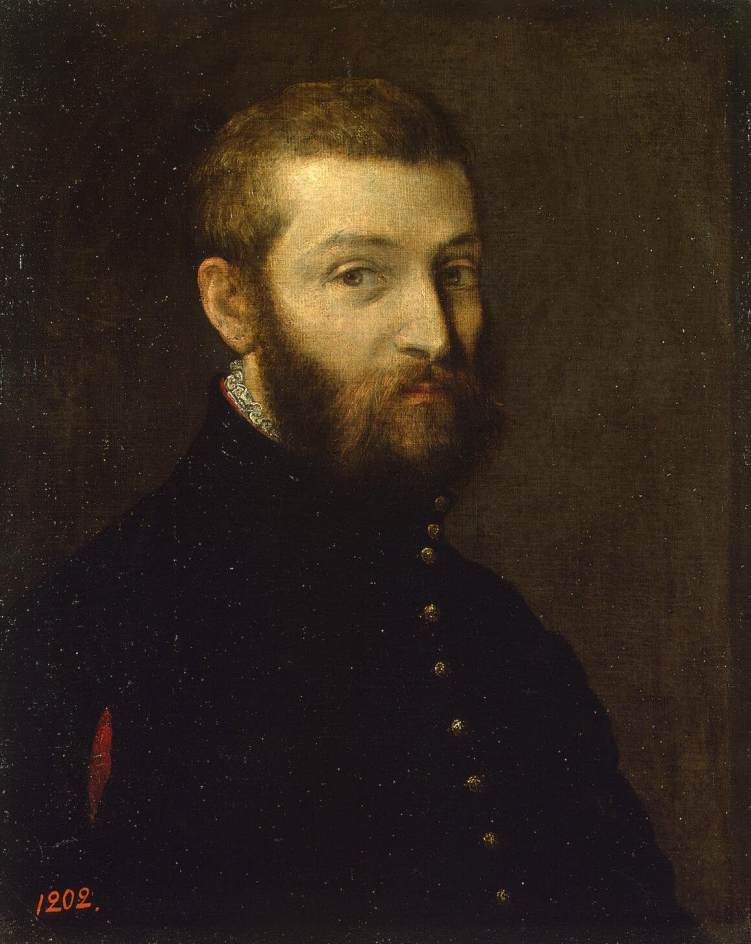
Self-portrait by Veronese

From the 16th to the 18th centuries, for 235 years, the painting decorated the refectory of the San Giorgio Monastery, until 11 September 1797, when soldiers of the French Revolutionary Army plundered the painting as war booty during the Italian campaigns of the French Revolutionary Wars (1792–1802). To readily transport the oversized painting – from a Venetian church to a Parisian museum – the French soldiers horizontally cut and rolled up the canvas of The Wedding Feast at Cana, to later be re-assembled and re-stitched in France. In 1798, Veronese's 235-year-old painting was stored in the first floor of the Louvre Museum; five years later, in 1803, that store of looted art had become the Musée Napoléon, the personal art collection of the future Emperor of the French.

In the early 19th century, after the Napoleonic Wars (1803–1815), the repatriation of looted works of art was integral to the post–Napoleonic conciliation treaties of France with Europe. Appointed by Pope Pius VII, the Neoclassical sculptor Antonio Canova went to France to oversee the return of works of art confiscated by the French under the terms of the Treaty of Paris (1815). Yet the chauvinist curator of the Musée Napoléon, Vivant Denon, falsely claimed that Veronese's canvas was too fragile to travel from Paris to Venice, and Canova excluded The Wedding Feast at Cana from repatriation to Italy, and, in its stead, sent to Venice the Feast at the House of Simon (1653), by Charles Le Brun. In the late 19th century, during the Franco-Prussian War (1870–71), The Wedding Feast at Cana was stored in a box at Brest, in Brittany.

In the mid 20th century, during the Nazi Occupation of France (1940–1945), the 382-year-old painting was rolled up for storage, and continually transported to hiding places throughout the south of France, lest Veronese's painting become part of the Nazi plunder collected during the Second World War.

In the early 21st century, on 11 September 2007, the 210th anniversary of the Napoleonic looting of the painting from Italy in 1797, a full-sized (6.77 m x 9.94 m) computer-generated (1,591 files), digital facsimile of The Wedding Feast at Cana was hung in the Palladian refectory of the Monastery of San Giorgio Maggiore, which the Giorgio Cini Foundation, Venice, and the Musée du Louvre, Paris, commissioned from Factum Arte, in Madrid.

== Restoration ==
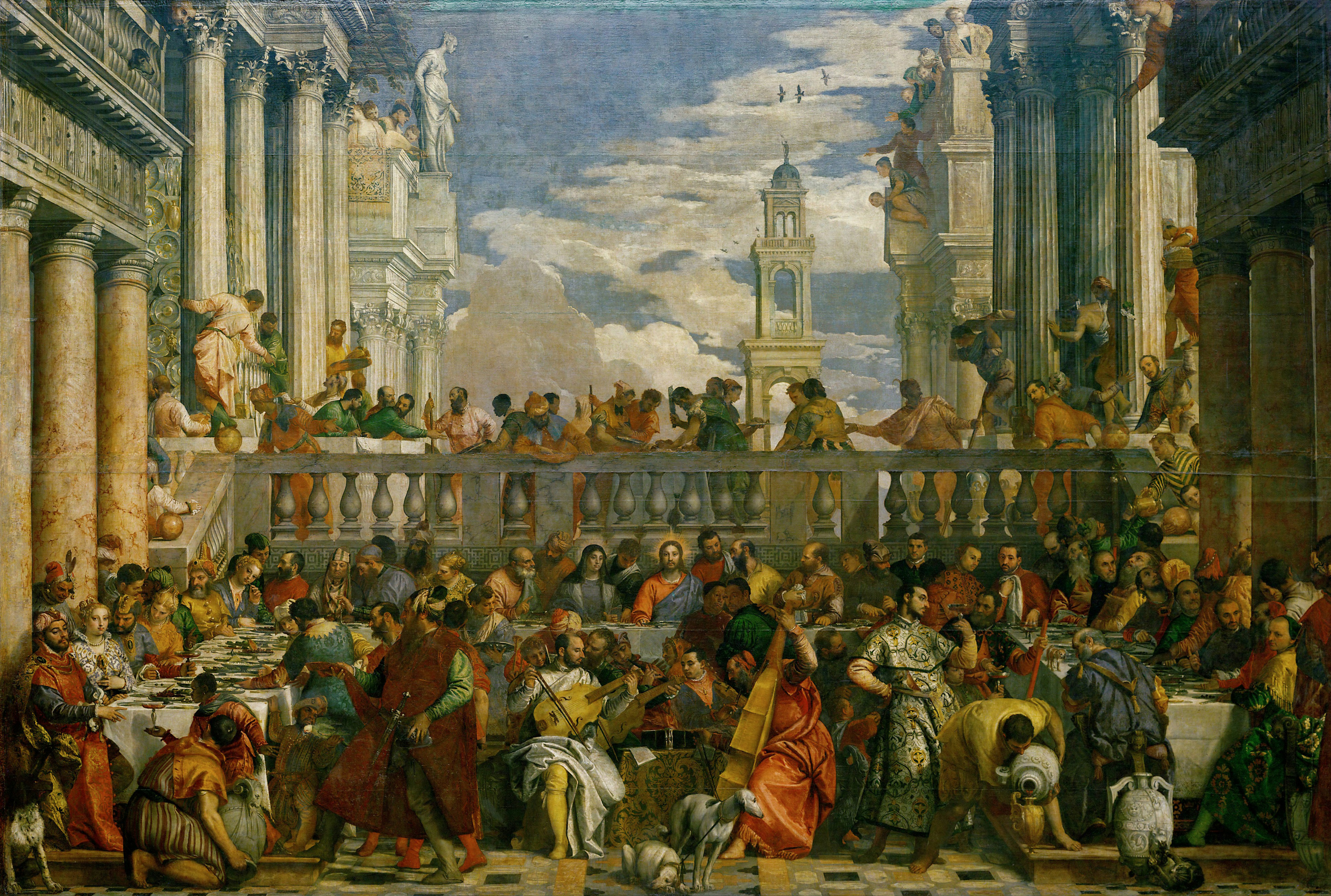
Until the late 20th century, when the Louvre Museum restored The Wedding Feast at Cana, the steward of the house (standing in the lower-left-quarter) wore a red tabard coat as seen here.

In 1989, the Louvre Museum began a painting restoration of The Wedding Feast at Cana, which provoked an art-world controversy like that caused by the 11-year Restoration of the Sistine Chapel frescoes (1989–1999). Organised as the Association to Protect the Integrity of Artistic Heritage (APIAH), artists protested against the restoration of the 426-year-old painting, and publicly demanded to be included in the matter, which demand the Louvre Museum denied.

To the APIAH, especially controversial was the Museum's removal of a rouge marron red hue over-painting of the tabard coat of the house steward, who is standing (left-of-centre) in the foreground supervising the black, servant-boy handing a glass of the new, red wine to the bridegroom. The removal of the red hue revealed the original, green colour of the tabard. In opposing that aspect of the painting's restoration, the APIAH said that Veronese, himself, had changed the tabard's colour to rouge marron instead of the green colour of the initial version of the painting.

In June 1992, three years into the restoration, the painting twice suffered accidental damage. In the first accident, the canvas was spattered with rainwater that leaked into the museum through an air vent. In the second accident, which occurred two days later, the Louvre curators were raising the 1.5-ton-painting to a higher position upon the display-wall when a support-frame failed and collapsed. In falling to the museum floor, the metal framework that held and transported the painting punctured and tore the canvas; fortuitously, the five punctures and tears affected only the architectural and background areas of the painting, and not the faces of the wedding guests.

== See also ==
- Renaissance banquet
- 100 Great Paintings, 1980 BBC series

== Notes ==
- Louvre Visitor's Guide, English version (2004)
