= Hague Congress =

There have been three events called as the Hague Congress:

- Hague Congress (1872), 5th General Congress of the International Workingmen's Association
- Hague Congress of 1915, also known as the International Congress of Women or Women's Peace Congress (1915)
- Hague Congress (1948), pioneering convention of European federalist movement
