= Johan Beyen =

Dutch politician and diplomat

His Excellency Johan Beyen
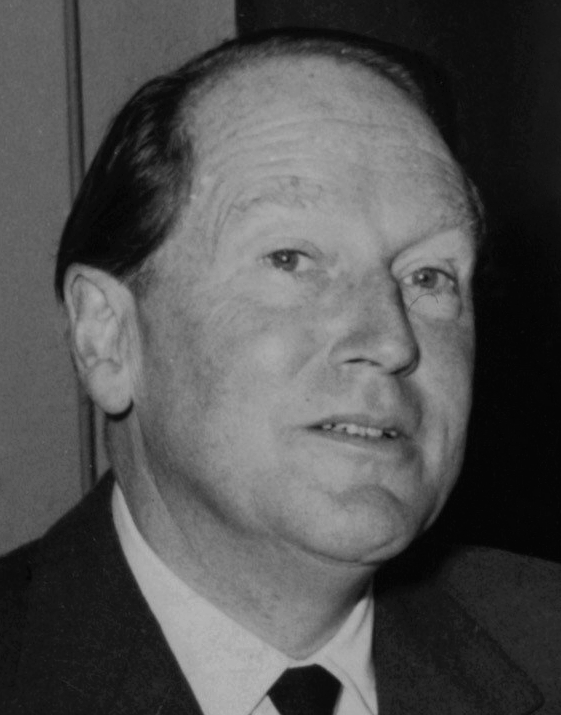
- Johan Beyen in 1955

Ambassador of the Netherlands to France
- In office 1 January 1957 – 1 January 1962
- Preceded by: Unknown
- Succeeded by: Unknown

Ambassador of the Netherlands to Germany
- In office 1 January 1957 – 1 January 1958
- Preceded by: Unknown
- Succeeded by: Unknown

Minister of Foreign Affairs
- In office 2 September 1952 – 13 October 1956
- Prime Minister: Willem Drees
- Preceded by: Dirk Stikker
- Succeeded by: Joseph Luns

Personal details
- Born: Johan Willem Beijen; 2 May 1897 Utrecht, Netherlands
- Died: 29 April 1976 (aged 78) The Hague, Netherlands
- Party: Independent Liberal
- Spouses: Petronella Hijmans van Anrooy (m. 1922; div. 1945) Margaretha Lubinka (m. 1945)
- Children: Has Beyen (1923–2002); 1 other son and 1 daughter (first marriage); 1 stepson (second marriage)
- Education: Utrecht University (Bachelor of Laws, Master of Laws)
- Occupation: Politician · Diplomat · Civil servant · Economist · Financial adviser · Financial analyst · Businessman · Banker · Corporate director · Nonprofit director · Lobbyist

Johan Willem "Wim" Beyen (2 May 1897 – 29 April 1976) was a Dutch politician and diplomat of Liberal signature and businessman. Beyen played an important role in the creation of the European Economic Community and is regarded as one of the Founding fathers of the European Union.

== Personalia ==
The official surname of Johan Willem (Wim) Beyen was Beijen, but he preferred to write his name as Beyen because he thought that this name was more appropriate for his international connections (the "ij" digraph only occurs in Dutch).

His father, Karel Hendrik Beijen, was a lawyer. He was the company secretary of the Maatschappij tot Exploitatie van Staatsspoorwegen, one of the Dutch railroad companies. His mother, Louisa Maria Coenen, stemmed from a family of musicians. He had two brothers. One of them was the archaeologist Hendrik Gerard Beyen.

In 1922, Wim Beyen married Petronella J.G. (Nelly) Hijmans van Anrooij. They had two sons and a daughter. At the end of the 1930s, Beyen had a relationship with the Austrian Margaretha Antonia (Gretel) Lubinka. After World War II his first marriage was dissolved and he married Gretel. This marriage was a happy one.

Wim Beyen died in 1976.

== Education ==
Wim Beyen grew up in Utrecht and the neighbouring town of Bilthoven. He studied law at Utrecht University. In 1918, he was awarded a doctorate in law.

== Successful careers in the public and the private sector ==
After his study Beyen was engaged as a temporary assistant clerk at the Dutch Ministry of Finance. At that time, he was only 21 years old. Within a few years, he rose to the rank of Deputy Treasurer-General.

After 1924, Beyen had several positions in the business sector: secretary of the board of Philips, head of the Dutch branch of the central bank of the Dutch East Indies, director of one of the predecessors of the AMRO Bank, vice president and from 1937 president of the Bank for International Settlements in Basel, and director of Unilever.

During World War II, he was, in addition to his position at Unilever, a financial advisor to the Dutch government in exile in London. In 1944, he headed the Dutch delegation to the Bretton Woods Conference where the foundations were laid for the World Bank and the International Monetary Fund. From 1946, he was the Dutch representative in the board of the World Bank and from 1948 also in that of the IMF.

== Minister of Foreign Affairs ==
In 1952 Wim Beyen, who did not belong to a political party, was appointed Minister of Foreign Affairs in the Second Drees cabinet. He was asked in order to ensure a better balance of powers within the cabinet. It was an odd situation that Joseph Luns, who was a member of the Catholic People's Party, was Minister without portfolio in the same Ministry. One of the jokes about this construction was "The Netherlands is so small, and therefore their foreign countries altogether are so large, that one Minister of Foreign Affairs is not enough."

The relationship between both ministers was not too good, because they had a completely different style of operating and disagreed about several issues. Beyen, for instance, had serious objections to Luns's attitude in the disputes with Indonesia about Netherlands New Guinea.

After the 1956 elections, Beyen's political career came to an end. There was no longer a need for a nonpartisan minister in the cabinet.

== Founder of European integration ==
Wim Beyen played a very important role in the creation of the European Economic Community.

In August 1954 the plans had collapsed to create a European Political Community and a common defence force, the European Defence Community, as a substitute for the national armies of France, Germany, Italy and the three Benelux countries, when France refused to ratify the Treaty.

Beyen realized that European integration in the political field would be impossible in the near future. He was convinced that had to be begun with economic cooperation and developed a plan that called for a European common market, combined with the idea of a political community. He was in favour of horizontal integration instead of continuing with a sector-by-sector integration along the lines of the European Coal and Steel Community (ECSC).

On 4 April 1955 he sent a memorandum to his Benelux colleagues Paul-Henri Spaak (Belgium) and Joseph Bech (Luxembourg) in which he proposed his idea of a customs union. In a meeting of the three Foreign Ministers of the Benelux in The Hague on 23 April 1955 they drafted a joint memorandum to present to their colleagues of the ECSC. They finalized the memorandum (the Benelux memorandum) on 18 May 1955 and presented it to the governments of France, Germany and Italy on 20 May 1955. They proposed to discuss in a conference of the six participating countries of the ECSC the way towards a general integration of the European economy.

This conference, the Messina Conference, was held from 1 to 3 June 1955. Beyen headed the Dutch delegation. The final resolution of the conference largely reflected Beyen's point of view. It formed the basis for further work to relaunch European integration and would lead to the Treaties of Rome in 1957 and the formation of the European Economic Community and Euratom in 1958.

== Decorations ==
Honours
Ribbon bar	Honour	Country	Date	Comment
	Knight of the Order of the Netherlands Lion	Netherlands	1927	
	Grand Officer of the Order of Orange-Nassau	Netherlands	21 November 1956	

Civic offices
Preceded by Leonardus Trip	Treasurer-General for the Ministry of Finance; Ad interim 1923	Succeeded by Arnold van Doorninck		
Political offices
Preceded by Dirk Stikker	Minister of Foreign Affairs; 1952–1956	Succeeded by Joseph Luns		
Diplomatic posts
Unknown	Ambassador of the Netherlands to Germany; 1957–1958	Unknown		
Unknown	Ambassador of the Netherlands to France; 1958–1962	Unknown		
Business positions
Preceded by Office established	Executive Director of the World Bank Group; 1946–1948	Unknown	Executive Director of the International Monetary Fund; 1946–1948	Unknown
