= Venice Conference =

The Venice Conference was held in Venice on 29 and 30 May 1956. The Foreign Ministers of the six Member States of the European Coal and Steel Community met at the Cini Foundation on the Venetian island of San Giorgio Maggiore to discuss the Spaak Report of the Spaak Committee. At the conference the Foreign Ministers explained the views of the ECSC governments on the proposals in the Spaak Report. As a result of the conference they decided to organize the Intergovernmental Conference on the Common Market and Euratom in order to prepare for establishment of a common market and a European Community for the peaceful use of nuclear power.

The conference was chaired by Christian Pineau, French Minister for Foreign Affairs, and attended by Walter Hallstein (Federal Republic of Germany), Paul-Henri Spaak (Belgium), Maurice Faure, French State Secretary for Foreign Affairs, Gaetano Martino (Italy), Joseph Bech (Luxembourg) and Johan Willem Beyen (Netherlands).

== See also ==
- Messina Conference
- History of the European Union

== Sources ==
- The Venice Conference (29 and 30 May 1956). Picture on CVCE.eu (Centre for European Studies)
- Press release (Venice, 30 May 1956). Text available on CVCE.eu (Centre for European Studies)
