= Congress of Europe =

1948 congress on European integration held in The Hague, Netherlands

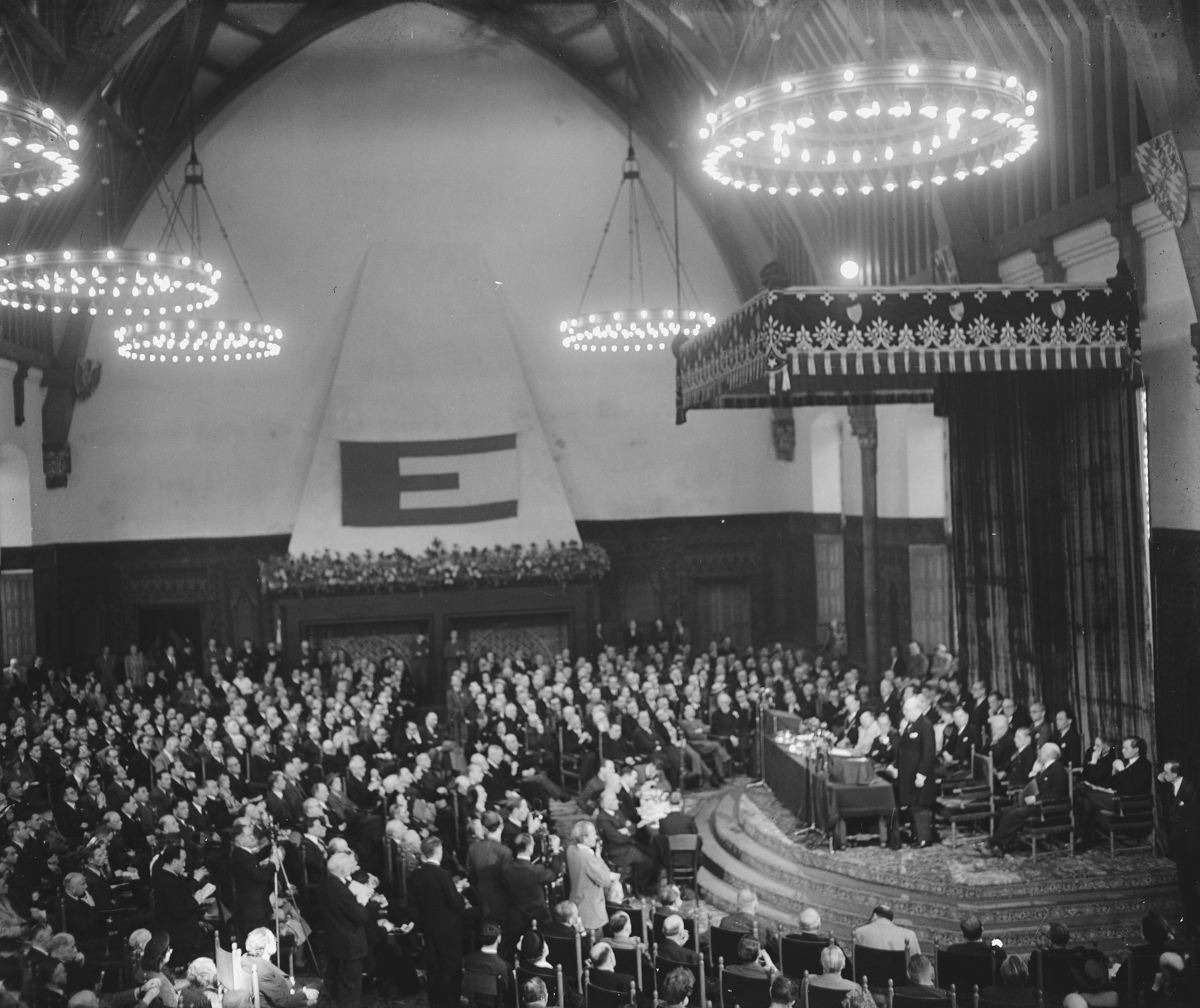
Meeting in the Hall of Knights in The Hague, during the congress (May 9, 1948)

The Hague Congress or the Congress of Europe was a conference that was held in The Hague from 7–11 May 1948 with 750 delegates participating from around Europe as well as observers from Canada and the United States.

The Congress, organized by Duncan Sandys and Józef Retinger, brought together representatives from across a broad political spectrum, providing them with the opportunity to discuss ideas about the development of European political co-operation. It was held under the auspices of the International Committee of the Movements for European Unity, subsequently to become the European Movement after the Congress.

Important political figures, such as Konrad Adenauer, Winston Churchill, Harold Macmillan, Sir David Maxwell-Fyfe, Pierre-Henri Teitgen, François Mitterrand (both ministers in Robert Schuman's government), three former French prime ministers, Paul Reynaud, Édouard Daladier, Paul Ramadier, Paul van Zeeland, Albert Coppé and Altiero Spinelli, took part.

A broad range of philosophers, journalists, church leaders, lawyers, professors, entrepreneurs and historians also took an active role in the congress. A call was launched for a political, economic and monetary Union of Europe. This landmark conference was to have a profound influence on the shape of the European Movement, which was created soon afterwards.

The Spanish statesman Salvador de Madariaga proposed the establishment of a College of Europe at the Congress. This would be a college where university graduates from many different countries, some only a short while before at war with each other, could study and live together.

The Congress also discussed the future structure and role of the Council of Europe. Teitgen and Maxwell-Fyfe were instrumental in creating the Convention for the Protection of Human Rights and Fundamental Freedoms at the Council of Europe.

The Congress provided the means to heighten public opinion for European unity. On 20 July 1948, at the Hague meeting of ministers of Western European Union, Schuman's Foreign Minister Georges Bidault proposed the creation of a European Assembly (realized in the later Council of Europe) and a customs and economic union (the later European Coal and Steel Community and the two communities of the Treaties of Rome). Thus the conclusions of the Congress became French government policy and then the subject of European governmental policy.

== Preparation of the Congress ==
The Congress was organised by the International Committee of the Movements for European Unity. The creation of a Committee for the Co-ordination of the International Movements for European Unity was agreed at a meeting in Paris on 20 July 1947 convened by Sandys and Retinger to bring together a number of existing organisations working for European unity - the European League for Economic Cooperation, the United Europe Movement, the Nouvelles Equipes Internationales and the European Union of Federalists. The European Parliamentary Union also participated in the meeting but subsequently declined to join the committee. Renamed the International Committee of the Movements for European Unity in December 1947, Sandys was elected its chairman and Retigner its Honorary Secretary.

Whilst the European Union of Federalists and the European Parliamentary Union had clear federalist objectives, the other organisations, "confined themselves officially to vague formulas: they wanted to 'increase and cultivate opportunities for co-operation among European nations (ELEC), 'to ensure to the government of the day wide support for any action which tends towards European unity' (UEM) and in general to evolve pragmatically towards a confederal union".

== Conclusions of the Congress ==
The Congress adopted three resolutions, each prepared by a Commission: a Political Resolution, an Economic and Social Resolution, and a Cultural Resolution.

The Political Resolution reflected the attempt to find common ground between the federalists and those who favoured a more gradualist, intergovernmental approach. As Retinger subsequently recalled, "There were heated debates, particularly in the Political Commission as the Federalists, led by Paul Reynaud, called for a European Constituent Assembly directly elected by the people of Europe. Others wanted a more modest consultative Assembly, more likely to prove more acceptable to the governments...for that reason the call for 'the pooling and transfer of sovereign rights' prevailed over that for a 'Federalist State'".

== Participants (selection) ==
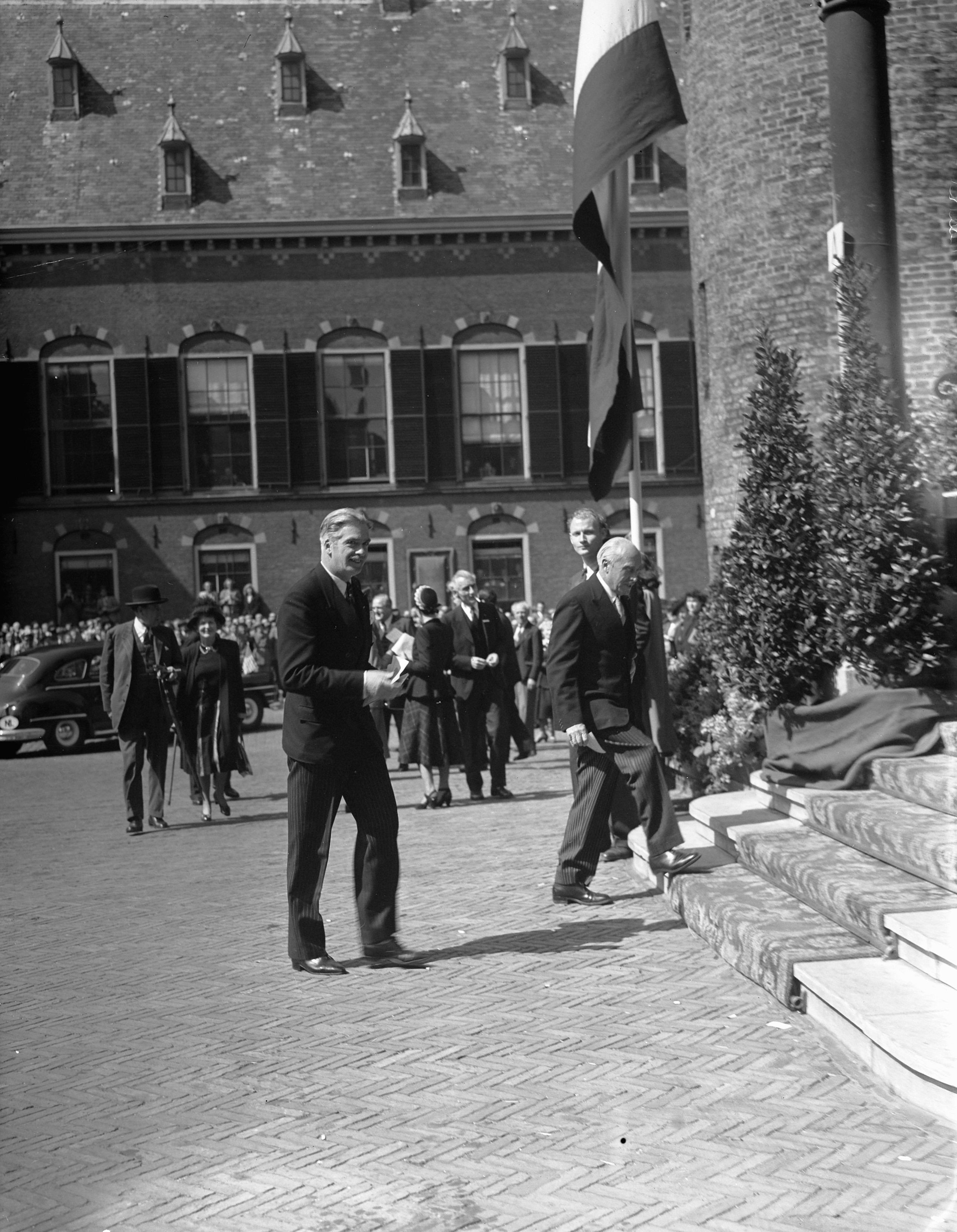
Sir Anthony Eden arriving at the Hall of Knights in The Hague (May 9, 1948)

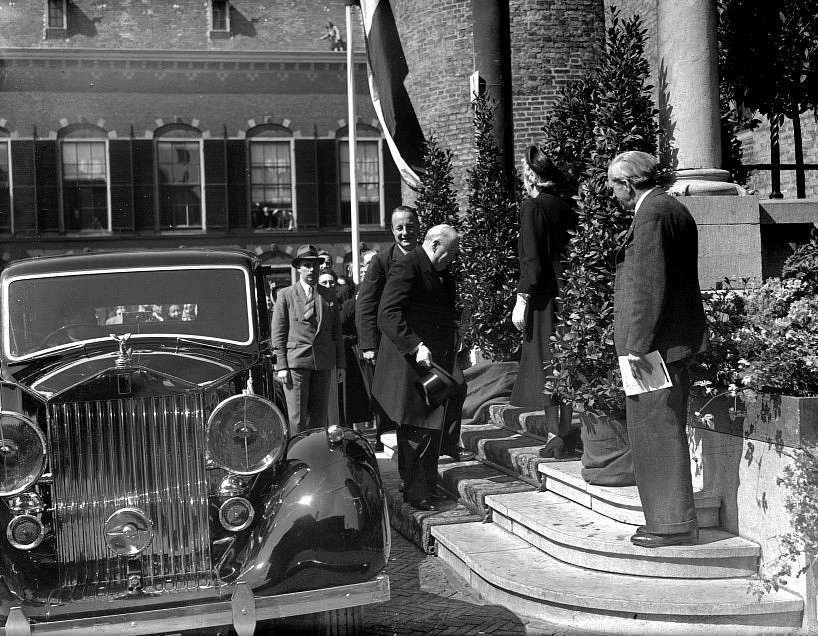
Sir Winston Churchill arriving at the European Congress in The Hague (May 9, 1948)

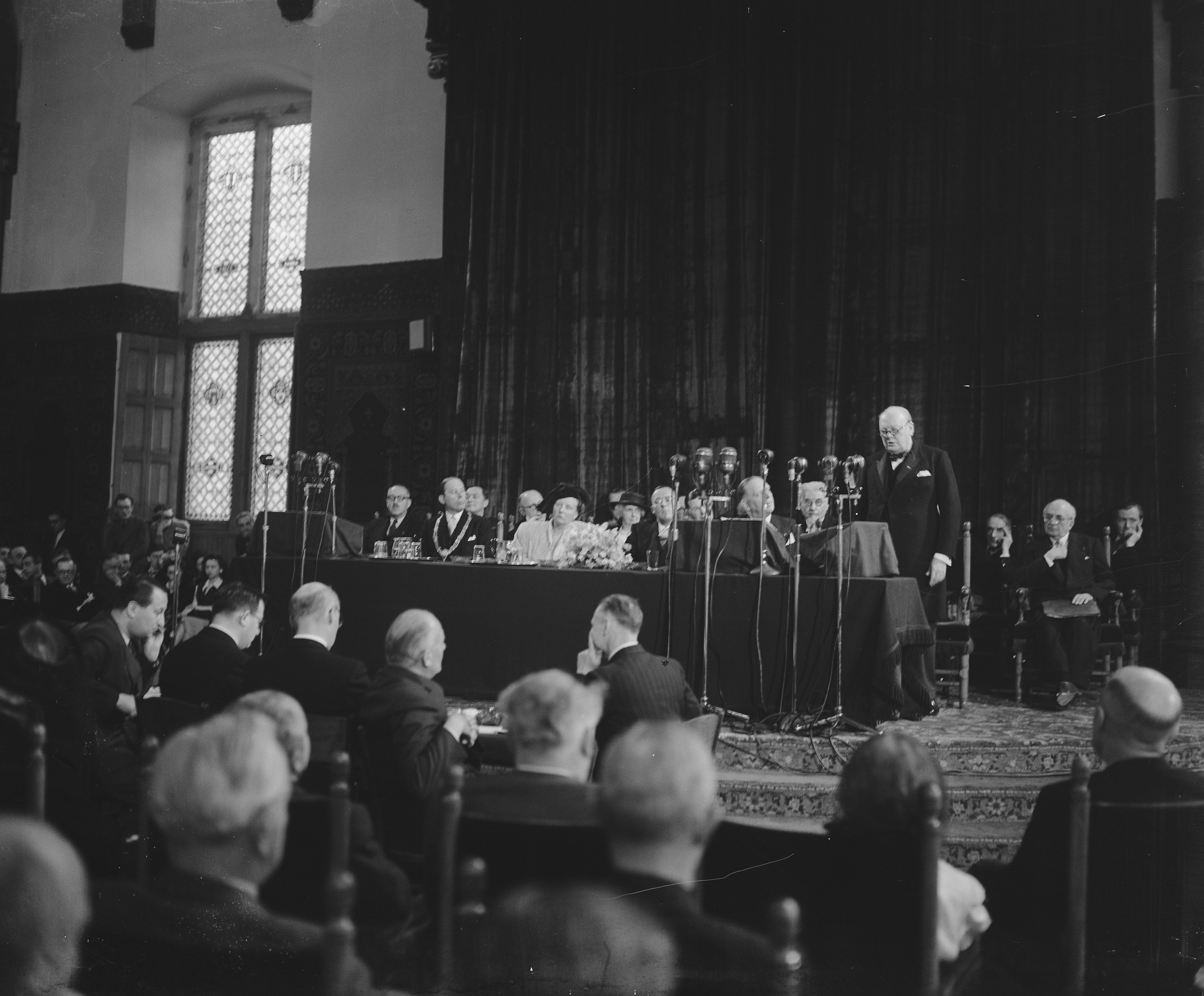
Winston Churchill opening the congress.

Marcel Pilet-Golaz, Winston Churchill, Grigore Gafencu, Édouard Daladier, Albert-Édouard Janssen, Antony Eden, Juraj Krnjevic, Knut Kristensen, Indalecio Prieto, Hjalmar J. Procopé, Paul Ramadier, Paul Reynaud, Tadeusz Romer, Paul van Zeeland, Jacques Augarde, Gustav Heinemann, Johannes Hoffmann, François Mitterrand, Konrad Adenauer, Duncan Sandys, Józef Retinger, Léon Chevalme, Alphonse Colle, Maurice Schumann, Richard Coudenhove-Kalergi, Auguste Cool, Henri Lambotte, Henri Davezac, Ivo Duchacek, Carl Romme, Gaston Tessier, Živko Topalović, Édouard Bonnefous, Georges Chevrot, Paolo Giobbe; André François-Poncet, André Lefèvre, marquis d'Ormesson, Nicolò Carandini, Étienne Gilson, Charles Morgan, Bertrand Russell, Salvador de Madariaga; Raymond Rifflet, William Rappard, Walter Hallstein, René Capitant, Léon Julliot, Lord Moran, Michel Polonowski, Émile Borel, Gilbert Murray, Ivison Macadam, Peter Fleming, Henry de Ségogne, Jacques Rueff, Maurice Allais, Jan Tinbergen, Harold Butler, Louis Salleron, Jacques Lacour-Gayet, Pierre Hély d’Oissel, Pieter Otten, Adrian Boult, Paul Landowski, Raymond Aron, René Courtin, Walter Layton, Jan Piłsudski, Raymond Silva, Gilberte Brossolette, Frances L. Josephy, Germaine Peyroles, Edmond Michelet, Jean de Suzannet, Hugh Delargy, Jean Mathé, Jean Buchmann, Henri Koch, Altiero Spinelli, André Voisin, Robert Bichet, Alexandre Marc, François de Menthon, Luc Durand-Réville, Robert Lemaignen, Edmond Giscard d’Estaing, Henri Cangardel, Georges Le Brun Kéris.

== See also ==
- Robert Schuman
- History of the European Communities (1945-1957)
- History of the European Union
- Council of Europe
- European Communities
- Federalist flag
- supranationalism
- supranational union
- Schuman Declaration
