= Spaak Report =

The Spaak Report or Brussels Report on the General Common Market is the report drafted by the Spaak Committee in 1956. The Intergovernmental Committee, headed by Paul-Henri Spaak, presented its definitive report on 21 April 1956 to the six governments of the member states of the European Coal and Steel Community.

The report formed the cornerstone of the Intergovernmental Conference on the Common Market and Euratom at Val Duchesse in 1956 and led to the signing, on 25 March 1957, of the Treaties of Rome establishing a European Economic Community and the European Atomic Energy Community.

== Summary ==
The Spaak Report concluded that a sector-by-sector integration of the European economies would be difficult. Instead, a horizontal integration of the economy, by the gradual elimination of trade barriers, seemed to be the way to continue. The goal was to be achieved by creating a customs union.

On the integration of the energy sectors, there was a different stance for nuclear energy and for hydrocarbon energy sources (oil, coal). The integration of the European nuclear energy sector was desirable because of the costs involved, which surpassed the financial capacity of individual states. The integration of the development of nuclear energy at a supranational level meant more efficient cost sharing for the development of nuclear energy. The integration of hydrocarbon energy sources at a supranational level was less feasible, as these energy sources were managed mainly by multinational companies. The integration of electricity and fuel gas seemed irrelevant, as they were distributed solely at a national level.

== See also ==
- Messina Conference
- Noordwijk Conference
- Ohlin Report
- Venice Conference

== Sources ==
- Spaak Report (English summary)
- Spaak Report (French)
- Treaties of Rome, preparation
- Interview with Jean François Poncet: the importance of the Spaak Report in the Val Duchesse negotiations (Paris, 16 March 2007)
