= Cini Foundation =

Venetian art and research institute

Coordinates: 45°25′45″N 12°20′36″E

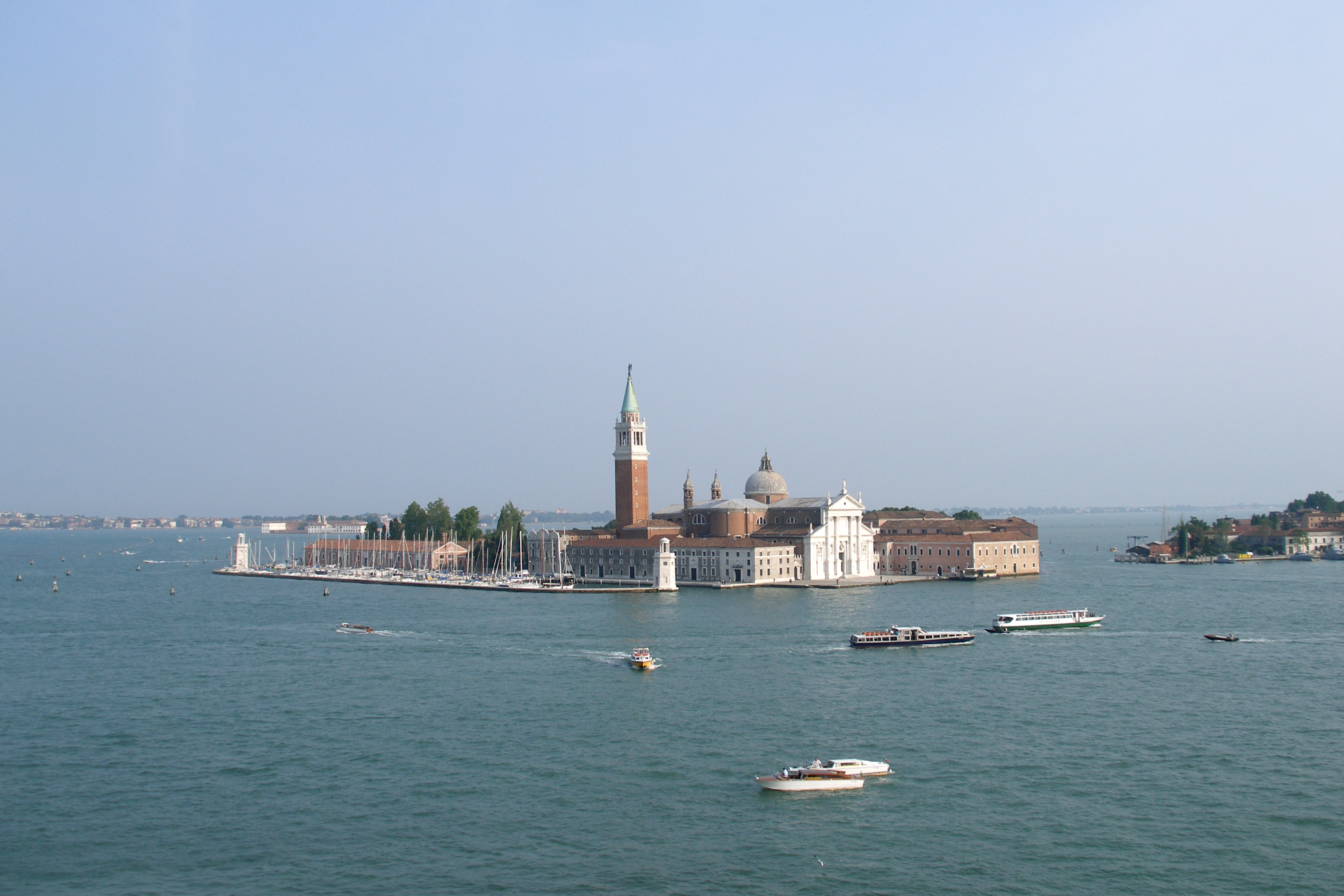
The island of San Giorgio Maggiore is home to the Cini Foundation

The Giorgio Cini Foundation (Italian: Fondazione Giorgio Cini), or just the Cini Foundation, is a cultural foundation founded by industrialist and politician Vittorio Cini on 20 April 1951 in memory of Giorgio Cini, his son who died in an airplane accident near Cannes in August 1949.

== History ==
The Foundation is located in the former San Giorgio Monastery on the island of San Giorgio Maggiore, Venice.

Vittorio Cini had a long relationship with the Italian Fascist party, joining in 1926, and had occupied influential positions within government and industry throughout the decades of Benito Mussolini's rule. In early 1943 he was named to the Ministry of Communication, but soon resigned, publicly castigating the obvious dire state of the national situation. He joined the plotting against Mussolini, and with the Nazi occupation of Northern Italy, he was arrested by the SS and sent to the Dachau concentration camp. Transferred to a hospital, his son Giorgio was able to get him released by bribing officials with diamonds and jewelry. Giorgio would also lobby successfully against the elder Cini's legal exclusion from political activities, arguing that his final break with Mussolini mitigated his long years of collaboration.

== Purpose and collections ==
Part of the original purpose of the Foundation was to rebuild the convent that had been destroyed by Napoleon and later used by the Austrian Army, then the Italian Army, and rehabilitate the island within the context of the cultural history of Venice. It now houses a historical library of about 15,000 volumes, an archive of manuscripts, and a collection concerning documents about history, music, theater and art. It is also a venue for exhibitions, concerts and meetings. As such it was a meeting place for the G7 meetings in 1980 and 1987.

The Foundation possess manuscripts and letters of famous persons of the theatrical and literary life of Italy at the turn of the nineteenth and twentieth century, including Arrigo Boito, Eleonora Duse, Gabriele D'Annunzio, Giovanni Pascoli, Gian Francesco Malipiero, and Diego Valeri (poet). The Malipiero collection includes the library of the composer as well as scores, correspondence and many musical autographs. The Foundation also retains most of the music by Nino Rota, including a collection of sketches.

The Foundation also is home to the School of San Giorgio for the Study of Venetian Civilisation, an academic center to examine the contributions of the Republic of Venice to civilization.

== La Foresteria ==
The Foresteria are the exclusive guest quarters that were built for Cini's friends and have been reserved for important guests who attend meetings at the Cini Foundation. Filled with valuable art and presenting across the water a view of St. Mark's Square and the Doge's Palace, the place has been visited by heads of state including Jimmy Carter, Margaret Thatcher, Ronald Reagan, François Mitterrand, Romano Prodi, Carlo Azeglio Ciampi, and King Juan Carlos I of Spain.

== Sources ==
The initial English version of this article is based on the corresponding Italian version in Wikipedia from February 11, 2009
