= Gaetano Martino =

Italian politician (1900–1967)

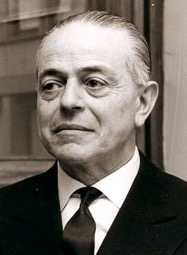

President of the European Parliament
- In office 27 March 1962 – 21 March 1964
- Preceded by: Hans Furler
- Succeeded by: Jean Duvieusart

Minister of Foreign Affairs
- In office 19 September 1954 – 6 May 1957
- Prime Minister: Mario Scelba; Antonio Segni
- Preceded by: Attilio Piccioni
- Succeeded by: Giuseppe Pella

Minister of Public Education
- In office 10 February 1954 – 19 September 1954
- Prime Minister: Mario Scelba
- Preceded by: Egidio Tosato
- Succeeded by: Giuseppe Ermini

Member of the Chamber of Deputies
- In office 8 May 1948 – 21 July 1967
- Constituency: Catania

Member of the Constituent Assembly
- In office 25 June 1946 – 31 January 1948
- Constituency: Catania

Personal details
- Born: 25 November 1900 Messina, Kingdom of Italy
- Died: 21 July 1967 (aged 66) Rome, Italy
- Party: Liberal
- Spouse: Alberta Stagno d'Alcontres
- Children: 3 sons, including Antonio
- Education: Sapienza University of Rome
- Profession: Physician, teacher

Gaetano Martino (25 November 1900 – 21 July 1967) was an Italian politician, physician, and university teacher.

== Early life and medicine ==
Gaetano Martino was born in 1900 in Messina, Sicily, son of its Mayor Antonino Martino. He graduated in medicine from the Sapienza University of Rome in 1923. He worked as physician for Saint-Antoine Hospital in Paris. In 1934, he became a teacher at the University of Messina and later was also dean of the university from 1943 to 1954. From 1966 to 1967, Martino was also dean of the Sapienza University of Rome.

== Political career ==
=== Foreign minister ===
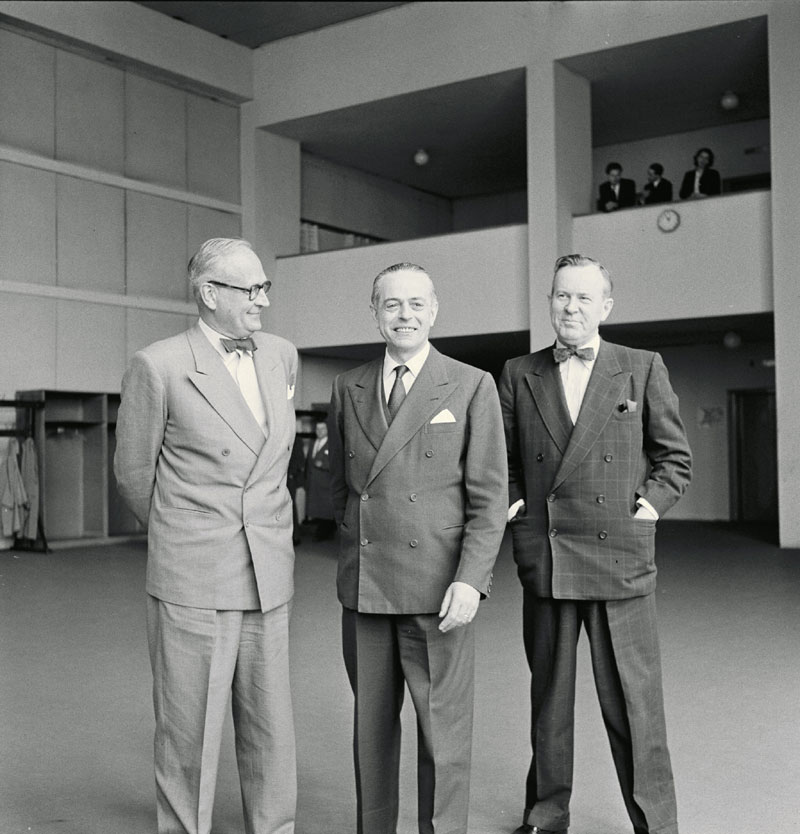
Gaetano Martino (mid), with Halvard Lange (r), and Lester B. Pearson (l), in 1956

Martino was a prominent Liberal politician. He was elected in 1948 to the Chamber of Deputies, becoming briefly Minister of Public Education in 1954 under Christian Democrat Mario Scelba. Later that year, Martino became Minister of Foreign Affairs after replacing Attilio Piccioni, who was involved in the Montesi Affair. Martino maintained this Ministry during Antonio Segni's Cabinet (1954–1957), but was finally removed from office by new Prime Minister Adone Zoli.

As Minister of Foreign Affairs, Martino promoted closer European integration and internationalism, first with the Messina Conference in 1955. In 1956, he facilitated Italian entry to the United Nations. In that same year Martino, along with Halvard Lange from Norway and Lester Pearson from Canada, became a "sage" of NATO, promoting its involvement in civil areas. Martino also attended the Treaty of Rome in 1957, which established the European Economic Community.

=== The "Armoire of Shame" ===
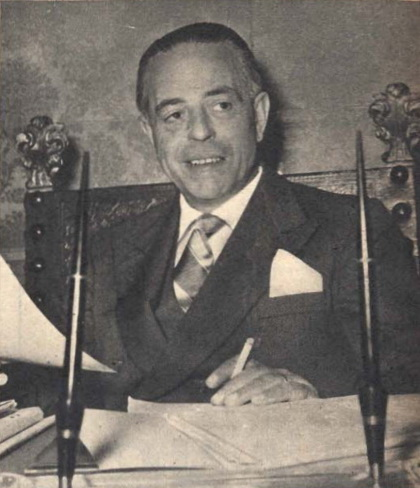
Gaetano Martino in 1954.

In 1956, the newspaper la Repubblica published an article in which Martino said that investigations on German war crimes in Italy during World War II would have a negative impact on West Germany's integration into Europe. In 1994, with the discovery at a military base of an armoire containing secret documents on Nazi war crimes in Italy, nicknamed the "Armoire of Shame" ("Armadio della Vergogna"), it emerged that Martino had blocked investigations into these crimes to avoid German isolation during the Cold War.

== Later life ==
For his role in promoting European integration, Martino was elected President of the European Parliament in 1962. He also continued to serve as Deputy in the Italian Chamber until his death in July 1967.

== Electoral history ==
Election	House	Constituency	Party	Votes	Result
1946	Constituent Assembly	Catania–Messina–Ragusa–Enna	UDN	30,332	Elected
1948	Chamber of Deputies	Catania–Messina–Ragusa–Enna	BN	28,464	Elected
1953	Chamber of Deputies	Catania–Messina–Ragusa–Enna	PLI	40,671	Elected
1958	Chamber of Deputies	Catania–Messina–Ragusa–Enna	PLI	55,475	Elected
1963	Chamber of Deputies	Catania–Messina–Ragusa–Enna	PLI	61,627	Elected

Political offices
Preceded by Attilio Piccioni	Italian Minister of Foreign Affairs; 1954–1957	Succeeded by Giuseppe Pella
Preceded by Egidio Tosato	Italian Minister of Public Instruction; 1954–1955	Succeeded by Giuseppe Ermini
Preceded by Hans Furler	President of the European Parliament; 1962–1964	Succeeded by Jean Pierre Duvieusart
