= Treaty of Rome =

1957 founding treaty of the European Economic Community

Treaty establishing the European Economic Community
- Signing ceremony of the treaty at the Palazzo dei Conservatori, on Capitoline Hill, Rome
- Type: Founding treaty
- Signed: 25 March 1957
- Location: Capitoline Hill in Rome, Italy
- Effective: 1 January 1958
- Parties: EU member states
- Depositary: Government of Italy

Full text
- Treaty establishing the European Economic Community at Wikisource

The Treaty of Rome, or EEC Treaty (officially the Treaty establishing the European Economic Community), brought about the creation of the European Economic Community (EEC), the best known of the European Communities (EC). The treaty was signed on 25 March 1957 by Belgium, France, Italy, Luxembourg, the Netherlands and West Germany, and it came into force on 1 January 1958. Originally the "Treaty establishing the European Economic Community", and now continuing under the name "Treaty on the Functioning of the European Union", it remains one of the two most important treaties in what is now the European Union (EU).

The treaty proposed the progressive reduction of customs duties and the establishment of a customs union. It proposed to create a common market for goods, labour, services, and capital across member states. It also proposed the creation of a Common Agriculture Policy, a Common Transport Policy and a European Social Fund and established the European Commission.

The treaty has been amended on several occasions since 1957. The Maastricht Treaty of 1992 removed the word "economic" from the Treaty of Rome's official title, and in 2009, the Treaty of Lisbon renamed it the "Treaty on the Functioning of the European Union".

== History ==
=== Background ===
In 1951, the Treaty of Paris was signed, creating the European Coal and Steel Community (ECSC). The Treaty of Paris was an international treaty based on international law, designed to help reconstruct the economies of the European continent, prevent war in Europe and ensure a lasting peace.

The original idea was conceived by Jean Monnet, a senior French civil servant and it was announced by Robert Schuman, the French Foreign Minister, in a declaration on 9 May 1950. The aim was to pool Franco-West German coal and steel production, because the two raw materials were the basis of the industry (including war industry) and power of the two countries. The proposed plan was that Franco-West German coal and steel production would be placed under a common High Authority within the framework of an organisation that would be open for participation to other European countries. The underlying political objective of the European Coal and Steel Community was to strengthen Franco-German cooperation and banish the possibility of war.

France, West Germany, Italy, Belgium, Luxembourg, and the Netherlands began negotiating the treaty. The Treaty Establishing the ECSC was signed in Paris on 18 April 1951, and entered into force on 24 July 1952. The Treaty expired on 23 July 2002, after fifty years, as was foreseen. The common market opened on 10 February 1953 for coal, iron ore and scrap, and on 1 May 1953 for steel.

Partly in the aim of creating a United States of Europe, two further Communities were proposed, again by the French. A European Defence Community (EDC) and a European Political Community (EPC). While the treaty for the latter was being drawn up by the Common Assembly, the ECSC parliamentary chamber, the EDC was rejected by the French Parliament. President Jean Monnet, a leading figure behind the Communities, resigned from the High Authority in protest and began work on alternative Communities, based on economic integration rather than political integration.

As a result of the energy crises, the Common Assembly proposed extending the powers of the ECSC to cover other sources of energy. However, Monnet desired a separate Community to cover nuclear power, and Louis Armand was put in charge of a study into the prospects of nuclear energy use in Europe. The report concluded that further nuclear development was needed, in order to fill the deficit left by the exhaustion of coal deposits and to reduce dependence on oil producers. The Benelux states and West Germany were also keen on creating a general common market; however, this was opposed by France owing to its protectionist policy, and Monnet thought it too large and difficult a task. In the end, Monnet proposed creating both as separate Communities to attempt to satisfy all interests. As a result of the Messina Conference of 1955, Paul-Henri Spaak was appointed as chairman of a preparatory committee, the Spaak Committee, charged with the preparation of a report on the creation of a common European market. Both the Spaak report and the Treaty of Rome were drafted by Pierre Uri, a close collaborator of Monnet.

=== Move towards a common market ===
The Spaak Report drawn up by the Spaak Committee provided the basis for further progress and was accepted at the Venice Conference (29 and 30 May 1956) where the decision was taken to organise an Intergovernmental Conference. The report formed the cornerstone of the Intergovernmental Conference on the Common Market and Euratom at Val Duchesse in 1956.

The outcome of the conference was that the new Communities would share the Common Assembly (now the Parliamentary Assembly) with the ECSC, as they would the European Court of Justice. However, they would not share the ECSC's Council or High Authority. The two new High Authorities would be called Commissions, from a reduction in their powers. France was reluctant to agree to more supranational powers; hence, the new Commissions would have only basic powers, and important decisions would have to be approved by the Council (of national Ministers), which now adopted majority voting. Euratom fostered co-operation in the nuclear field, at the time a very popular area, and the European Economic Community was to create a full customs union between members.

In 1965, France's president Charles de Gaulle decided to recall French representatives from dealing with the Council of Ministers, greatly crippling the EEC's operations. This was known as the "Empty Chair Crisis." To resolve this, the members agreed to the Luxembourg Compromise, in which veto power was given to members of the EC on decisions. The countries of the European Community held a meeting in The Hague in 1969. At this summit, they collectively ordered an increase to the European Parliament's budget while also committing towards a shift away from national economic policy to greater international policy. Following this agreement, two new European Structural Investment Funds were created, which were the European Regional Development Fund and the European Social Fund. These focused on the reallocation of investment funds towards the development of the economies of the member states.

=== Signing ===
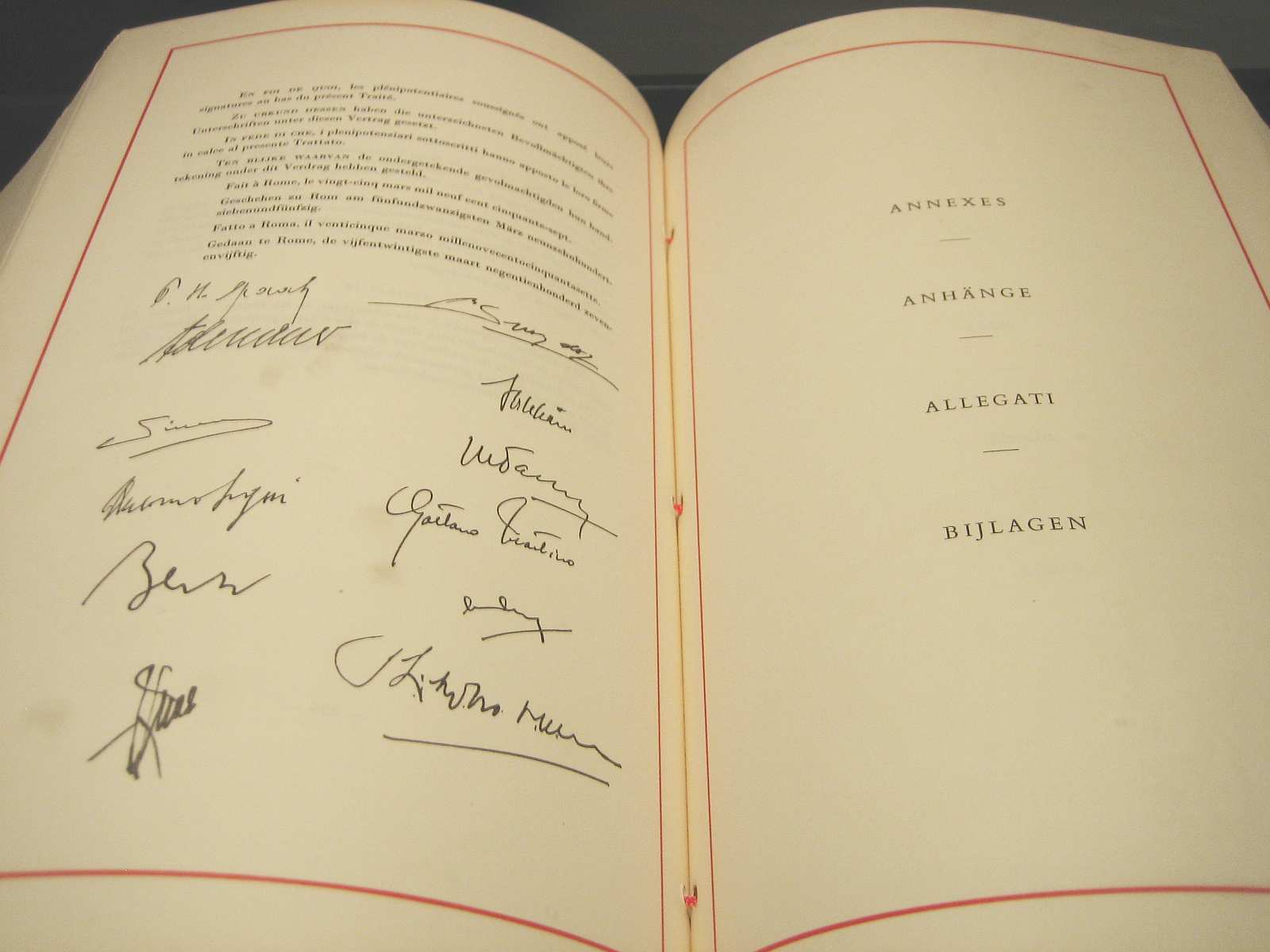
The signature page on the original Treaty of Rome

The conference led to the signing on 25 March 1957, of the Treaty establishing the European Economic Community and the Euratom Treaty at the Palazzo dei Conservatori on Capitoline Hill in Rome. 25 March 1957 was also the Catholic feast day of the Annunciation of Mary.

In March 2007, the BBC's Today radio programme reported that delays in printing the treaty meant that the document signed by the European leaders as the Treaty of Rome consisted of blank pages between its frontispiece and page for the signatures.

Signatories	For
Paul-Henri Spaak · Jean-Charles Snoy et d'Oppuers	Belgium
Konrad Adenauer · Walter Hallstein	West Germany
Christian Pineau · Maurice Faure	France
Antonio Segni · Gaetano Martino	Italy
Joseph Bech · Lambert Schaus	Luxembourg
Joseph Luns · Hans Linthorst Homan	Netherlands

=== Anniversary commemorations ===
Major anniversaries of the signing of the Treaty of Rome have been commemorated in numerous ways.

==== Commemorative coins ====
Commemorative coins have been struck by numerous European countries, notably at the 30th and 50th anniversaries (1987 and 2007 respectively).

==== 2007 celebrations in Berlin ====
In 2007, celebrations culminated in Berlin with the Berlin declaration preparing the Lisbon Treaty.

==== 2017 celebrations in Rome ====
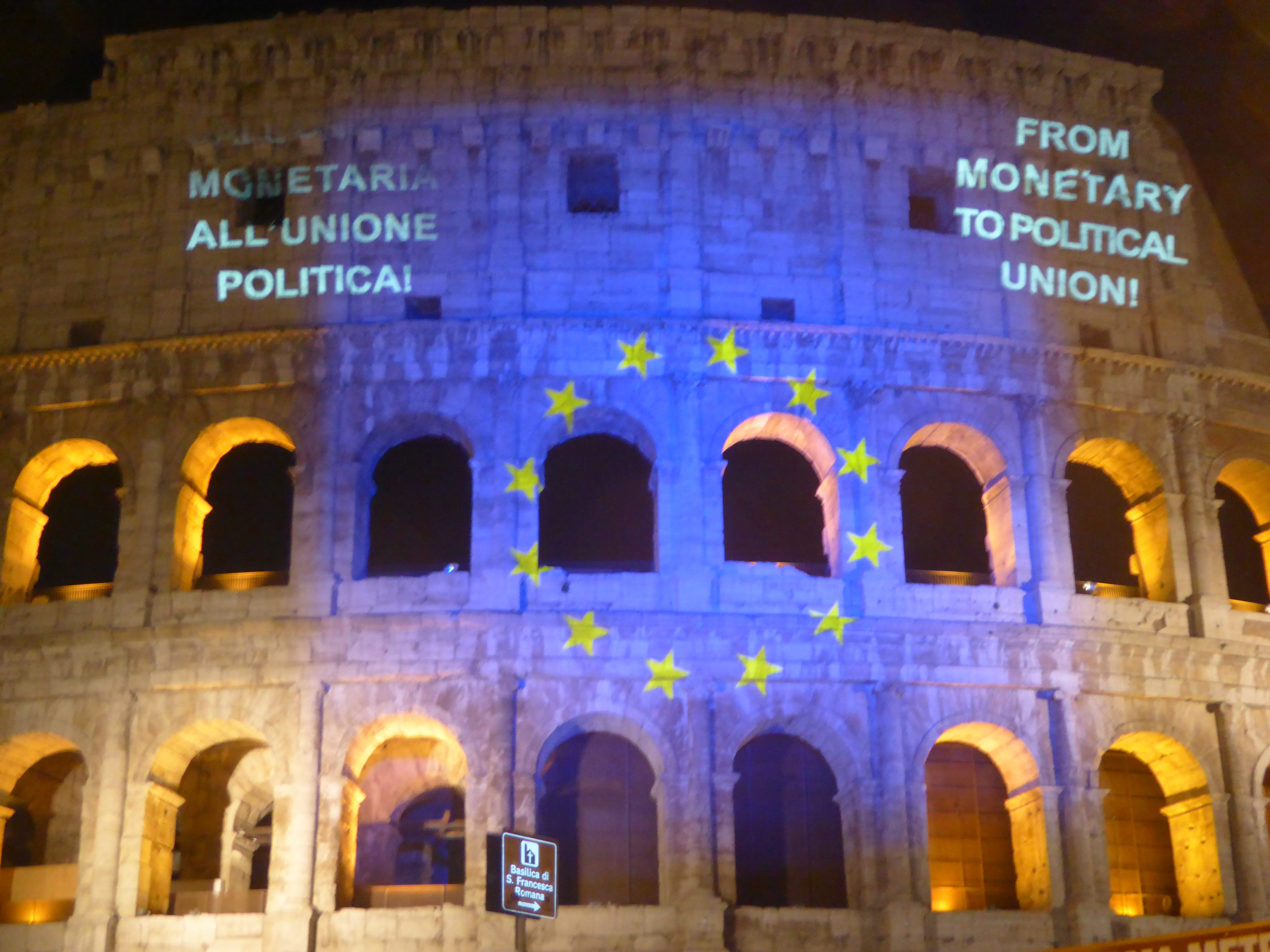
One of the events in preparation of the 60th anniversary: projection on the Colosseum by the Young European Federalists

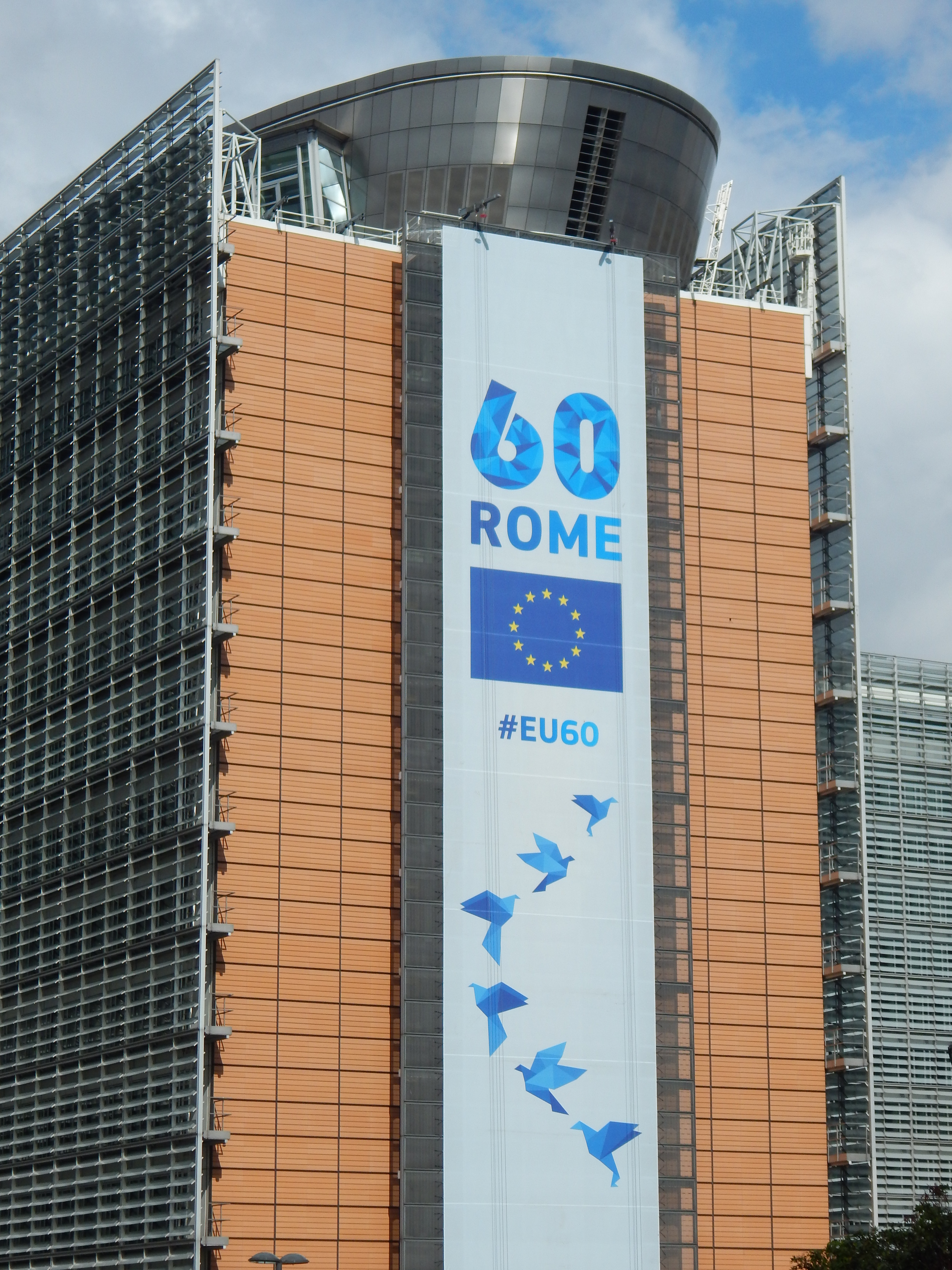
Poster celebrating the 60th anniversary of the Treaty of Rome, on the Berlaymont building

In 2017, Rome was the centre of multiple official and popular celebrations. Street demonstrations were largely in favour of European unity and integration, according to several news sources.

=== Historical assessment ===
According to the historian Tony Judt, the Treaty of Rome did not represent a fundamental turning point in the history of European integration:

It is important not to overstate the importance of the Rome Treaty. It represented for the most part a declaration of future good intentions...Most of the text constituted a framework for instituting procedures designed to establish and enforce future regulations. The only truly significant innovation – the setting up under Article 177 of a European Court of Justice to which national courts would submit cases for final adjudication – would prove immensely important in later decades but passed largely unnoticed at the time.

== Timeline ==
Since the end of World War II, most sovereign European countries have entered into treaties and thereby co-operated and harmonised policies (or pooled sovereignty) in an increasing number of areas, in the European integration project or the construction of Europe (French: la construction européenne). The following timeline outlines the legal inception of the European Union (EU) — the principal framework for this unification. The EU inherited many of its present organisations, institutions and responsibilities from the European Communities (EC), which were founded in the 1950s in the spirit of the Schuman Declaration.

Legend:
S: signing
F: entry into force
T: termination
E: expiry
de facto supersession
Rel. w/ EC/EU framework:
de facto inside
outside

European Union (EU)
[Cont.]
European Communities (EC)
(Pillar I)

European Atomic Energy Community (EAEC or EURATOM)

[Cont.]

/ / / European Coal and Steel Community (ECSC)

(Distr. of competences)

European Economic Community (EEC)

Schengen Rules
European Community (EC)
TREVI
Justice and Home Affairs (JHA, pillar III)

/ North Atlantic Treaty Organisation (NATO)
[Cont.]
Police and Judicial Co-operation in Criminal Matters (PJCC, pillar III)

Anglo-French alliance
[Defence arm handed to NATO]
European Political Co-operation (EPC)

Common Foreign and Security Policy
(CFSP, pillar II)
Western Union (WU)
/ Western European Union (WEU)
[Tasks defined following the WEU's 1984 reactivation handed to the EU]

[Social, cultural tasks handed to CoE]
[Cont.]

Council of Europe (CoE)
Entente Cordiale
S: 8 April 1904
Dunkirk Treaty (Note: Although not EU treaties per se, these treaties affected the development of the EU defence arm, a main part of the CFSP. The Franco-British alliance established by the Dunkirk Treaty was de facto superseded by WU. The CFSP pillar was bolstered by some of the security structures that had been established within the remit of the 1955 Modified Brussels Treaty (MBT). The Brussels Treaty was terminated in 2011, consequently dissolving the WEU, as the mutual defence clause that the Lisbon Treaty provided for EU was considered to render the WEU superfluous. The EU thus de facto superseded the WEU.)
S: 4 March 1947
F: 8 September 1947
E: 8 September 1997
Brussels Treaty
S: 17 March 1948
F: 25 August 1948
T: 30 June 2011
London and Washington treaties
S: 5 May/4 April 1949
F: 3 August/24 August 1949
Paris treaties: ECSC and EDC (Note: Plans to establish a European Political Community (EPC) were shelved following the French failure to ratify the Treaty establishing the European Defence Community (EDC). The EPC would have combined the ECSC and the EDC.)
S: 18 April 1951/27 May 1952
F: 23 July 1952/?
E: 23 July 2002/—
Protocol Modifying and
Completing the Brussels Treaty
S: 23 October 1954
F: 6 May 1955
Rome treaties: EEC and EAEC
S: 25 March 1957
F: 1 January 1958
WEU-CoE agreement
S: 21 October 1959
F: 1 January 1960
Brussels (Merger) Treaty (Note: The European Communities obtained common institutions and a shared legal personality (i.e. ability to e.g. sign treaties in their own right).)
S: 8 April 1965
F: 1 July 1967
Davignon report
S: 27 October 1970
European Council conclusions
S: 2 December 1975
Single European Act (SEA)
S: 17/28 February 1986
F: 1 July 1987
Schengen Agreement and Convention
S: 14 June 1985/19 June 1990
F: 26 March 1995
Maastricht Treaty (Note: The treaties of Maastricht and Rome form the EU's legal basis, and are also referred to as the Treaty on European Union (TEU) and the Treaty on the Functioning of the European Union (TFEU), respectively. They are amended by secondary treaties.) (Note: Between the EU's founding in 1993 and consolidation in 2009, the union consisted of three pillars, the first of which were the European Communities. The other two pillars consisted of additional areas of cooperation that had been added to the EU's remit.)
S: 7 February 1992
F: 1 November 1993
Amsterdam Treaty
S: 2 October 1997
F: 1 May 1999
Nice Treaty
S: 26 February 2001
F: 1 February 2003
Lisbon Treaty (Note: The consolidation meant that the EU inherited the European Communities' legal personality and that the pillar system was abolished, resulting in the EU framework as such covering all policy areas. Executive/legislative power in each area was instead determined by a distribution of competencies between EU institutions and member states. This distribution, as well as treaty provisions for policy areas in which unanimity is required and qualified majority voting is possible, reflects the depth of EU integration as well as the EU's partly supranational and partly intergovernmental nature.)
S: 13 December 2007
F: 1 December 2009

== See also ==
- History of the European Union
- Intergovernmental Conference on the Common Market and Euratom
- Ohlin Report
- Spaak Report
- European Coal and Steel Community
- Euratom
- European Economic Community
