= Spaak Committee =

The Spaak Committee was an Intergovernmental Committee set up by the Foreign Ministers of the six Member States of the European Coal and Steel Community (ECSC) as a result of the Messina Conference of 1955. The Spaak Committee started its work on 9 July 1955 and ended on 20 April 1956, when the Heads of Delegation of the six Member States of the ECSC approved the Spaak report. The committee worked on two main topics, one was the creation of a general common market and the other one was the establishment of a European Community for the peaceful use of atomic energy.

The steering committee was composed of Paul-Henri Spaak, the six heads of delegation from the ECSC member states and a representative, Russell Frederick Bretherton, of the United Kingdom. The different committees examined the common market, investments and social issues, conventional energy, nuclear energy and public transport and public works. In addition several highly specialised subcommittees would then be set up, depending on the topics raised, which might relate to either customs or nuclear matters.

The common market was the core issue of the committee, although the question of agriculture also arose. In addition transportation and conventional energy were also to be dealt with. By November 1955 the focus of the committee was on the establishment of the common market by abolition of trade barriers, customs arrangements with third countries, social and financial harmonisation and the establishment of common institutions.

On 6 September 1955 at the Noordwijk Conference, Spaak presented an interim report. In October 1955 the United Kingdom decided to leave the Spaak Committee as the UK opposed a customs union and did not want to submit its atomic research program to Euratom. On 25 September 1955 the Treaty of Association between the ECSC and the United Kingdom was already enough for the UK. Russell Bretherton left the committee on 7 November 1955.

The Ministers for Foreign Affairs of the ECSC convened in Brussels on 11 and 12 February 1956 to take the final decisions. The Spaak Report was then published in April 1956. The Spaak report was presented to the foreign ministers of the six Member States of the ECSC on 21 April 1956 and at the Venice conference one month later.

The Spaak report was approved at the Venice Conference on 29 and 30 May 1956 and was used as the basis for discussion in the work of the Intergovernmental Conference on the Common Market and Euratom from July 1956 which met at the Château of Val-Duchesse in Brussels. This would lead to the Treaties of Rome being signed in 1957 which established the European Economic Community (EEC) and the European Atomic Energy Community (Euratom) among the members of the ECSC.

== See also ==
- History of the European Union
- BeNeLux memorandum
- Spaak method

== Sources ==
- The Spaak Committee on CVCE website (EU)
- The work of the Spaak Committee on CVCE website (EU)
- Interview de Jean-François Deniau: la position du Royaume-Uni (Brussels, 26 March 1997) on CVCE website
- W. Maas, The Genesis of European Rights, JCMS: Journal of Common Market Studies 43 (5), 1009–1025.
