= Intergovernmental Conference =

In the politics of the European Union, an Intergovernmental Conference (IGC) is the formal procedure for negotiating amendments to the EU's founding treaties. Under the treaties, an IGC is called into being by the European Council, and is composed of representatives of the member states, with the Commission, and to a lesser degree the Parliament also participating.

An IGC will conclude with a meeting of the European Council, at which any political issues requiring resolution at the level of Heads of State or Government will be resolved, and final political agreement will be reached. A final treaty text in each of the community languages will then be prepared by the legal and linguistic experts of the member states, before being presented to the member states for signature and ratification.

== List of International Governmental Conferences ==
- Intergovernmental Conference on the Common Market and Euratom of 1956.
- Intergovernmental Conference on the EMU of 1991
- Intergovernmental Conference on the Political Union of 1991
- Intergovernmental Conference on the Constitutional Treaty of 1996
- Intergovernmental Conference on the Constitutional Treaty of 2004
- Intergovernmental Conference on the Lisbon Treaty of 2007

== See also ==
- Intergovernmental Committee on Intellectual Property and Genetic Resources, Traditional Knowledge and Folklore, also known as "IGC"
