= Messina Conference =

1955 ECSC member state meeting

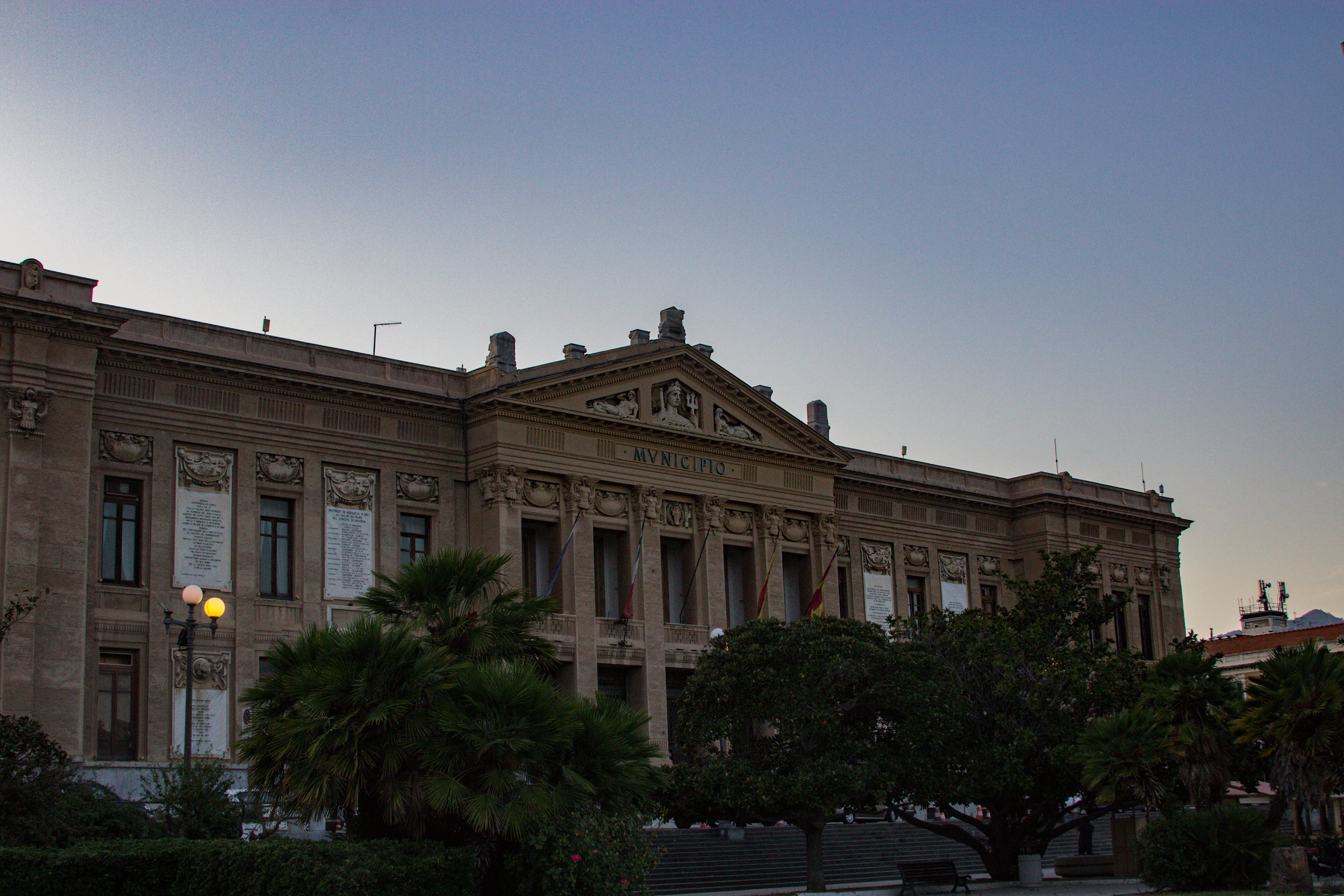
Palazzo Zanca in Messina, the main seat of the Conference

The Messina Conference of 1955 was a meeting of the six member states of the European Coal and Steel Community (ECSC). The conference assessed the progress of the ECSC and, deciding that it was working well, proposed further European integration. This initiative led to the creation in 1957 of the European Economic Community and Euratom.

The conference was held from 1 to 3 June 1955 at the Italian city of Messina, Sicily, in the City Hall building known as Palazzo Zanca (it). It was a meeting of the foreign ministers of all six member states of the ECSC, and it would lead to the creation of the European Economic Community. The delegations of the six participating countries were headed by Johan Willem Beyen (Netherlands), Gaetano Martino (Italy), Joseph Bech (Luxembourg), Antoine Pinay (France), Walter Hallstein (Germany), and Paul-Henri Spaak (Belgium). Joseph Bech was chairman of the meeting.

The Foreign Ministers of the ECSC had to meet in order to nominate a member of the High Authority of the ECSC and to appoint its new president and vice-presidents for the period expiring on 10 February 1957. The meeting was held at Messina (and partially in Taormina) at the request of Gaetano Martino, the Italian Foreign Minister, who was detained in Sicily because of the Regional Assembly elections. They appointed René Mayer as president of the High Authority to replace Jean Monnet. The ministers also reappointed the Belgian, Albert Coppé, and the German, Franz Etzel, as vice-presidents of the college.

In addition to the above-mentioned agenda, the meeting included consideration of the action programme to relaunch European integration. In August 1954 the plans had collapsed to create a European Political Community and a common defence force, the European Defence Community, as a substitute for the national armies of Germany, France, Italy, and the three Benelux countries, when France refused to ratify the treaty. The six ECSC countries then turned their attention to the idea of a customs union, which was elaborated at Messina. The final resolution of the conference, largely reflecting the point of view of the three Benelux countries, formed the basis for further work to relaunch European integration. The Benelux countries in their BeNeLux memorandum proposed a revival of European integration on the basis of a common market and integration in the transport and atomic energy sectors.

At first the name of Paul van Zeeland, former Belgian Prime Minister and Minister for Foreign Affairs, was mentioned to head the committee which was to work out a proposal. Johan Willem Beyen however proposed Paul-Henri Spaak, who was entrusted, on 18 June, with the production of a report at an Intergovernmental Committee in order to evaluate the option of a sectoral integration or the step-by-step establishment of a European common market. The Spaak Report of the Spaak Committee and the subsequent Intergovernmental Conference on the Common Market and Euratom which was held at the Château of Val-Duchesse would lead to the Treaties of Rome in 1957 and the formation of the European Economic Community and Euratom in 1958.

In commemoration of the conference, the square in front of Messina's Palazzo Zanca was renamed Piazza Unione Europea, and on 2 June 1995 a monumental commemorative plaque was inserted on the building's main façade. A statue of Gaetano Martino was erected nearby on 25 November 2000, the centenary of his birth.

== See also ==
- European University Institute
- History of the European Union

== Sources ==
- Messina Conference on CVCE.eu (Centre virtuel de la connaissance sur l'Europe)
- Minutes of the Messina Conference (EU) Available on CVCE.eu
- Delegations from the Six at the Messina Conference (EU) Available on CVCE.eu
- How Divided Europe Came Together (BBC)
- Messina Conference (picture)
