= Intergovernmental Conference on the Common Market and Euratom =

The Intergovernmental Conference on the Common Market and Euratom was held in Brussels and started on 26 June 1956 with a session in the Grand Salon of the Belgian Foreign Ministry. The negotiations went on at the Château of Val-Duchesse in Auderghem (Brussels) and would continue until March 1957. The conference was held to draft the Treaties establishing the European Economic Community (EEC) and the European Atomic Energy Community (EAEC or Euratom). The conference built on the results of the Spaak Report of the Spaak Committee and the decision taken at the Venice Conference to prepare the plan for the establishment of a common market and the establishment of a European Community for the peaceful use of atomic energy.

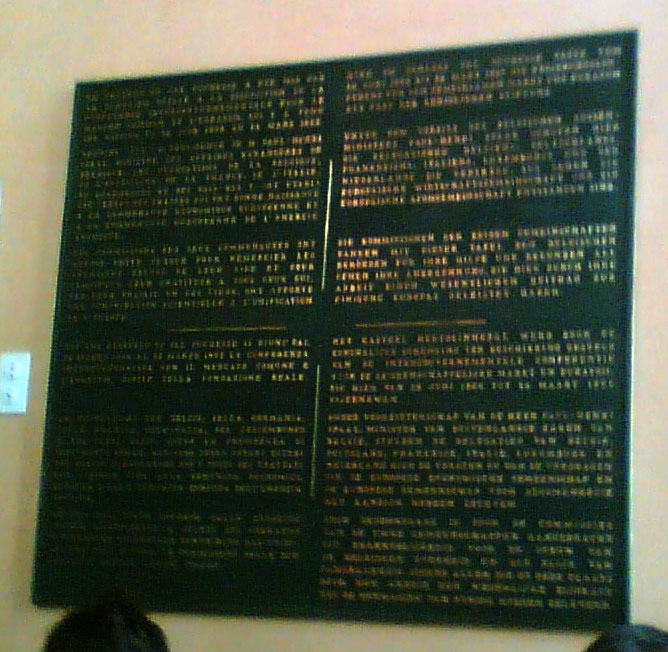
Plaque commemorating the Intergovernmental Conference of 1956. The same text is repeated in four languages.

The conference was headed by Belgian Foreign Minister Paul-Henri Spaak. The heads of the delegations from the six European Coal and Steel Community (ECSC) members were Lodovico Benvenuti (Italy), Count Jean Charles Snoy et d'Oppuers (Belgium), Carl Friedrich Ophüls (Federal Republic of Germany), Maurice Faure (France), Hans Linthorst Homan (Netherlands) and Lambert Schaus (Luxembourg).

== Common market ==
The basic principle of the common market was agreed upon by the six ECSC members, but there was wide disagreement about the procedures for its implementation. Both Germany and the three Benelux countries, with their export-oriented economies, favoured economic liberalism and wanted to reduce custom duties in order to lower the barriers for trade between the participating countries. On the other side stood France and Italy, with their less internationally competitive economies, which were primarily in favour of a mechanism for market regulation and a certain amount of protection from external competition. France wanted some way to include its African colonies in the forthcoming European common market. The participants of the conference could not reach a satisfactory agreement on a common agricultural policy, but the outcome of the conference provided for improvement in productivity, self-sufficiency in food for the community and the establishment of an adequate income for farmers.

== Euratom ==
The negotiations on Euratom were complicated by the French opposition against any power of Euratom on the military use of nuclear power that might hinder the acquisition of nuclear weapons for France. France wanted to share the cost of the development of civil nuclear research with Euratom, which would free financial resources for its own military nuclear research. Although the other countries were reluctant to accept that stance, in the end they agreed to leave the military use of nuclear research out of the treaty, subject to international controls. The US also opposed the emergence of an independent European nuclear force.

The Suez Crisis of 1956, which exposed the vulnerability of Europe regarding its energy supplies had an influence on the negotiations.

== Outcome ==
The conference would lead to the Treaties of Rome being signed on 25 March 1957. They established the European Economic Community (EEC) and the European Atomic Energy Community (Euratom) among the members of the ECSC.

== See also ==
- History of the European Union
- BeNeLux memorandum, 1955
- Spaak method
- Ohlin Report

== Sources ==
- Negotiations on the EEC and Euratom
- Treaty establishing the European Atomic Energy Community
- Raymond Bertrand, The European Common Market Proposal, International Organization, Vol. 10, No. 4 (Nov. 1956), pp. 559–574.
- Pierre-Henri Laurent, Paul-Henri Spaak and the Diplomatic Origins of the Common Market, 1955–1956, Political Science Quarterly, Vol. 85, No. 3 (Sep. 1970), pp. 373–396
