= Euratom =

International organization

European Atomic Energy Community: Европейска общност за атомна енергия (Bulgarian); Europska zajednica za atomsku energiju (Croatian); Evropské společenství pro atomovou energii (Czech); Europæiske Atomenergifællesskab (Danish); Europese Atoomenergie Gemeenschap (Dutch); Euroopa Aatomienergiaühendus (Estonian); Euroopan atomienergiayhteisö (Finnish); Communauté européenne de l'énergie atomique (French); Europäische Atomgemeinschaft (German); Ευρωπαϊκή Κοινότητα Ατομικής Ενέργειας (Greek); Európai Atomenergia Közösség (Hungarian); Comhphobal Eorpach um Fhuinneamh Adamhach (Irish); Comunità europea dell'energia atomica (Italian); Eiropas Atomenerģijas kopiena (Latvian); Europos atominės energetikos bendrija (Lithuanian); Komunità Ewropea tal-Enerġija Atomika (Maltese); Europejska Wspólnota Energii Atomowej (Polish); Comunidade Europeia da Energia Atómica (Portuguese); Comunitatea Europeană a Energiei Atomice (Romanian); Európske spoločenstvo pre atómovú energiu (Slovak); Evropska skupnost za jedrsko energijo (Slovene); Comunidad Europea de la Energía Atómica (Spanish); Europeiska atomenergigemenskapen (Swedish)
- Member states Participating associated states
- Administrative body: European Commission
- Official languages: 24 languages
- Type: International organisation
- Members: EU member states Associated states: Switzerland; United Kingdom
- Establishment: 1958
  - Euratom Treaty: 1 January 1958
  - Merger Treaty: 1 July 1967

The European Atomic Energy Community (EAEC or EURATOM) is an international organization established by the Euratom Treaty of 1957 with the original purpose of creating a specialist market for nuclear power in Europe, by developing nuclear energy and distributing it to its member states while selling the surplus to non-member states. Having become one of the three European Communities alongside the European Coal and Steel Community and the European Economic Community following the merger of their executive bodies in 1967, the Euratom is de facto under the authority of the European Union (EU) but remains de jure a separate organization.

It is legally distinct from the European Union although it has the same membership, and is governed by many of the EU's institutions; but it is the only remaining community organization that is independent of the EU and therefore outside the regulatory control of the European Parliament. Over the years its scope has been increased to cover a variety of areas associated with nuclear power and ionising radiation as diverse as safeguarding of nuclear materials, radiation protection, coordinating EU members' nuclear research programmes for peaceful purposes, and construction of the International Fusion Reactor.

Since 2014, Switzerland has also participated in Euratom programmes as an associated state. The United Kingdom ceased to be a full member of the organization on 31 January 2020. However, under the terms of the EU–UK Trade and Cooperation Agreement, the United Kingdom participates in Euratom as an associated state following the end of the transition period on 31 December 2020.

== History ==
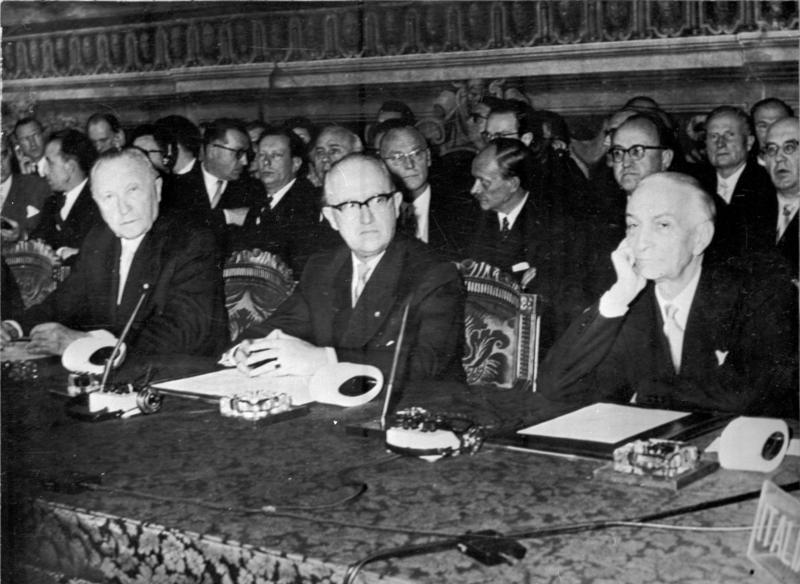
From left to right: Konrad Adenauer, Walter Hallstein, and Antonio Segni signing the European customs union and Euratom Treaty in Rome, Italy (Bundesarchiv, 1 April 1957)

The driving force behind the creation of the European Atomic Energy Community (EURATOM) was France's desire to develop nuclear power and nuclear weapons without having to rely on the United States and/or the United Kingdom. The costs of nuclear development were also large, motivating France to share the costs with the other member states of the European Coal and Steel Community (ECSC). During the negotiations to create Euratom, the United States and the United Kingdom sought to gain influence over nuclear development in Europe. Hence, the US and the UK created the European Nuclear Energy Agency (ENEA) as a way to limit the value of Euratom and gain influence over the spread of nuclear technology. The Soviet Union launched a propaganda campaign against Euratom, as it sought to stoke fears among Europeans that the organization would enable West Germany to develop nuclear weapons for its own military purposes.

The Intergovernmental Conference on the Common Market and Euratom at the Château of Val-Duchesse in 1956 drew up the essentials of the new treaties. Euratom would foster cooperation in the nuclear field, at the time a very popular area, and would, along with the EEC, share the Common Assembly and Court of Justice of the ECSC, but not its executives. Euratom would have its own Council and Commission, with fewer powers than the High Authority of the European Coal and Steel Community. On 25 March 1957, the Treaties of Rome (the Euratom Treaty and the EEC Treaty) were signed by the six ECSC members and on 1 January 1958 they came into force.

The Common Assembly proposed extending the powers of the ECSC to cover other sources of energy. However, Jean Monnet, ECSC architect and President, wanted a separate community to cover nuclear power. (Note: Nuclear power has been used since the 1950s as a low-carbon source of baseload electricity. Nuclear power plants in over 30 countries generate about 10% of global electricity. As of 2019, nuclear generated over a quarter of all low-carbon energy, making it the second largest source after hydropower.) The President of the European Commission, Louis Armand, was put in charge of a study into the prospects of nuclear energy use in Europe; his report concluded that further nuclear development was needed to fill the deficit left by the exhaustion of coal deposits and to reduce dependence on oil producers. However, the Benelux countries and West Germany were also keen on creating a general single market, although it was opposed by France due to its protectionism, and Jean Monnet thought it too large and difficult a task. In 1957, Monnet proposed the creation of separate atomic energy and economic communities to reconcile both groups. To save on resources, these separate executives created by the Rome Treaties were unified by the Merger Treaty in 1967. The institutions of the EEC would take over responsibilities for the running of the ECSC and Euratom, with all three then becoming known as the European Communities even if each legally existed separately. In 1993, the Maastricht Treaty set the foundation of the European Union (EU), which absorbed the Communities into the European Community pillar, while Euratom still maintained a distinct legal personality.

The European Constitution was intended to consolidate all previous treaties and increase democratic accountability in them. The Euratom Treaty had not been amended as the other treaties had, so the European Parliament had been granted few powers over it. However, the reason it had gone unamended was the same reason the Constitution left it to remain separate from the rest of the EU: a strong anti-nuclear sentiment among the European electorate, which may unnecessarily turn voters against the treaty. The Euratom treaty thus remains in force relatively unamended from its original signing.

== EU evolution timeline ==
Since the end of World War II, most sovereign European countries have entered into treaties and thereby co-operated and harmonised policies (or pooled sovereignty) in an increasing number of areas, in the European integration project or the construction of Europe (French: la construction européenne). The following timeline outlines the legal inception of the European Union (EU) — the principal framework for this unification. The EU inherited many of its present organisations, institutions and responsibilities from the European Communities (EC), which were founded in the 1950s in the spirit of the Schuman Declaration.

Legend:
S: signing
F: entry into force
T: termination
E: expiry
de facto supersession
Rel. w/ EC/EU framework:
de facto inside
outside

European Union (EU)
[Cont.]
European Communities (EC)
(Pillar I)

European Atomic Energy Community (EAEC or EURATOM)

[Cont.]

/ / / European Coal and Steel Community (ECSC)

(Distr. of competences)

European Economic Community (EEC)

Schengen Rules
European Community (EC)
TREVI
Justice and Home Affairs (JHA, pillar III)

/ North Atlantic Treaty Organisation (NATO)
[Cont.]
Police and Judicial Co-operation in Criminal Matters (PJCC, pillar III)

Anglo-French alliance
[Defence arm handed to NATO]
European Political Co-operation (EPC)

Common Foreign and Security Policy
(CFSP, pillar II)
Western Union (WU)
/ Western European Union (WEU)
[Tasks defined following the WEU's 1984 reactivation handed to the EU]

[Social, cultural tasks handed to CoE]
[Cont.]

Council of Europe (CoE)
Entente Cordiale
S: 8 April 1904
Dunkirk Treaty (Note: Although not EU treaties per se, these treaties affected the development of the EU defence arm, a main part of the CFSP. The Franco-British alliance established by the Dunkirk Treaty was de facto superseded by WU. The CFSP pillar was bolstered by some of the security structures that had been established within the remit of the 1955 Modified Brussels Treaty (MBT). The Brussels Treaty was terminated in 2011, consequently dissolving the WEU, as the mutual defence clause that the Lisbon Treaty provided for EU was considered to render the WEU superfluous. The EU thus de facto superseded the WEU.)
S: 4 March 1947
F: 8 September 1947
E: 8 September 1997
Brussels Treaty
S: 17 March 1948
F: 25 August 1948
T: 30 June 2011
London and Washington treaties
S: 5 May/4 April 1949
F: 3 August/24 August 1949
Paris treaties: ECSC and EDC (Note: Plans to establish a European Political Community (EPC) were shelved following the French failure to ratify the Treaty establishing the European Defence Community (EDC). The EPC would have combined the ECSC and the EDC.)
S: 18 April 1951/27 May 1952
F: 23 July 1952/?
E: 23 July 2002/—
Protocol Modifying and
Completing the Brussels Treaty
S: 23 October 1954
F: 6 May 1955
Rome treaties: EEC and EAEC
S: 25 March 1957
F: 1 January 1958
WEU-CoE agreement
S: 21 October 1959
F: 1 January 1960
Brussels (Merger) Treaty (Note: The European Communities obtained common institutions and a shared legal personality (i.e. ability to e.g. sign treaties in their own right).)
S: 8 April 1965
F: 1 July 1967
Davignon report
S: 27 October 1970
European Council conclusions
S: 2 December 1975
Single European Act (SEA)
S: 17/28 February 1986
F: 1 July 1987
Schengen Agreement and Convention
S: 14 June 1985/19 June 1990
F: 26 March 1995
Maastricht Treaty (Note: The treaties of Maastricht and Rome form the EU's legal basis, and are also referred to as the Treaty on European Union (TEU) and the Treaty on the Functioning of the European Union (TFEU), respectively. They are amended by secondary treaties.) (Note: Between the EU's founding in 1993 and consolidation in 2009, the union consisted of three pillars, the first of which were the European Communities. The other two pillars consisted of additional areas of cooperation that had been added to the EU's remit.)
S: 7 February 1992
F: 1 November 1993
Amsterdam Treaty
S: 2 October 1997
F: 1 May 1999
Nice Treaty
S: 26 February 2001
F: 1 February 2003
Lisbon Treaty (Note: The consolidation meant that the EU inherited the European Communities' legal personality and that the pillar system was abolished, resulting in the EU framework as such covering all policy areas. Executive/legislative power in each area was instead determined by a distribution of competencies between EU institutions and member states. This distribution, as well as treaty provisions for policy areas in which unanimity is required and qualified majority voting is possible, reflects the depth of EU integration as well as the EU's partly supranational and partly intergovernmental nature.)
S: 13 December 2007
F: 1 December 2009

== Cooperation ==
- Since 2014, Switzerland has participated in Euratom programmes as an associated state.
- Since January 2021, the United Kingdom participates in Euratom programmes as an associated state under the terms of the EU–UK Trade and Cooperation Agreement.
- As of 2024, Euratom maintains Co-operation Agreements of various scopes with ten countries: Armenia, Australia, Canada, India, Japan, Kazakhstan, South Africa, Ukraine, United States, and Uzbekistan.

== Withdrawal of the United Kingdom ==
The United Kingdom announced its intention to withdraw from the EAEC on 26 January 2017, following on from its decision to withdraw from the European Union. Formal notice to withdraw from the EAEC was provided in March 2017, within the Article 50 notification letter, where the withdrawal was made explicit. Withdrawal only became effective following negotiations on the terms of the exit, which lasted two years and ten months.

A report by the House of Commons' Business, Energy and Industrial Strategy Committee, published in May 2017, questioned the legal necessity of leaving Euratom, and called for a temporary extension of the United Kingdom's membership of Euratom in order to allow time for new arrangements to be made instead. In June 2017, the European Commission's negotiations task force published a Position paper transmitted to EU27 on nuclear materials and safeguard equipment (Euratom), titled "Essential Principles on nuclear materials and safeguard equipment". The following month, a briefing paper from the House of Commons Library assessed the implications of leaving Euratom.

In July 2017, an article published by The Independent questioned the availability of nuclear power to the United Kingdom after 2019 if the country were to withdraw from the Euratom Treaty, and the need for new treaties relating to the transportation of nuclear materials. During the same month, an article published by the New Scientist stated that radioisotope supply for cancer treatments would also need to be considered in new treaties.

British politicians speculated that the United Kingdom could retain its membership in the EAEC. In 2017, some argued that this would require—beyond the consent of the EU27—amendment or revocation of the Article 50 letter of March 2017. The Nuclear Safeguards Act 2018, making provision for safeguards after withdrawal from Euratom, received royal assent on 26 June 2018.

The EU–UK Trade and Cooperation Agreement, outlining the United Kingdom's relationship with the European Union from 1 January 2021 onwards, makes provision for the country's participation "as an associated country of all parts of the Euratom programme".

== Achievements ==
In the history of European regulation, Article 37 of the Euratom Treaty represents a pioneering legislation concerning binding transfrontier obligations with respect to environmental impact and protection of human lives, especially regarding the dismantling of nuclear reactors.

== President ==
N.	Portrait	President (Born–Died)	State	Took office	Left office	Commission	Party	Group	Electoral mandate	Refs
1		Louis Armand (1905–1971)	France	7 January 1958	2 February 1959	Armand	Independent	None	–	
1		Louis Armand (1905–1971)	France	1 year, 26 days		Armand	Independent	None	–	
2		Étienne Hirsch (1901–1994)	France	2 February 1959	10 January 1962	Hirsch	Independent	None	–	
2		Étienne Hirsch (1901–1994)	France	3 years, 8 days		Hirsch	Independent	None	–	
3		Pierre Chatenet (1917–1997)	France	10 January 1962	5 July 1967	Chatenet	Independent	None	–	
3		Pierre Chatenet (1917–1997)	France	5 years, 176 days		Chatenet	Independent	None	–	

== See also ==
- Energy Community (EC)
- Energy policy of the European Union
  - Nuclear energy in the European Union
    - The nuclear sector of the Seventh Framework Programme for research and technological development, the European Union's chief instrument for funding research.
- EU Directorate General Joint Research Centre, often incorrectly mistaken for EURATOM due to the organization being its origin.
- History of the European Union
  - Institutions of the European Union
- International Atomic Energy Agency (IAEA)
  - Integrated Nuclear Fuel Cycle Information System (iNFCIS)
- International Framework for Nuclear Energy Cooperation (IFNEC)
- Neighbourhood, Development and International Cooperation Instrument (NDICI-GE)
