= Davignon report =

The Davignon report, also referred to as the Luxembourg report, published on 27 October 1970, was a report on the future foreign policy of European Economic Community member nations. It was written by a council chaired by Étienne Davignon of the Belgian Foreign Office. The committee was appointed by the Council of the European Communities to make proposals on political cooperation between the member states. It recommended that member states should try to speak with a single voice on international problems, a proposal that was approved by all six member governments. It resulted first in European Political Cooperation and later in the European Union's Common Foreign and Security Policy in 1992.

Since the end of World War II, sovereign European countries have entered into treaties and thereby co-operated and harmonised policies (or pooled sovereignty) in an increasing number of areas, in the European integration project or the construction of Europe (French: la construction européenne). The following timeline outlines the legal inception of the European Union (EU)—the principal framework for this unification. The EU inherited many of its present responsibilities from the European Communities (EC), which were founded in the 1950s in the spirit of the Schuman Declaration.

Legend:
S: signing
F: entry into force
T: termination
E: expiry
de facto supersession
Rel. w/ EC/EU framework:
de facto inside
outside

European Union (EU)
[Cont.]
European Communities (EC)
(Pillar I)

European Atomic Energy Community (EAEC or Euratom)

[Cont.]

/ / / European Coal and Steel Community (ECSC)

(Distr. of competences)

European Economic Community (EEC)

Schengen Rules
European Community (EC)
TREVI
Justice and Home Affairs (JHA, pillar II)

/ North Atlantic Treaty Organisation (NATO)
[Cont.]
Police and Judicial Co-operation in Criminal Matters (PJCC, pillar II)

Anglo-French alliance
[Defence arm handed to NATO]
European Political Co-operation (EPC)

Common Foreign and Security Policy
(CFSP, pillar III)
Western Union (WU)
/ Western European Union (WEU)
[Tasks defined following the WEU's 1984 reactivation handed to the EU]

[Social, cultural tasks handed to CoE]
[Cont.]

Council of Europe (CoE)
Entente Cordiale
S: 8 April 1904
Dunkirk Treaty (Note: Although not EU treaties per se, these treaties affected the development of the EU defence arm, a main part of the CFSP. The Franco-British alliance established by the Dunkirk Treaty was de facto superseded by WU. The CFSP pillar was bolstered by some of the security structures that had been established within the remit of the 1955 Modified Brussels Treaty (MBT). The Brussels Treaty was terminated in 2011, consequently dissolving the WEU, as the mutual defence clause that the Lisbon Treaty provided for EU was considered to render the WEU superfluous. The EU thus de facto superseded the WEU.)
S: 4 March 1947
F: 8 September 1947
E: 8 September 1997
Brussels Treaty
S: 17 March 1948
F: 25 August 1948
T: 30 June 2011
London and Washington treaties
S: 5 May/4 April 1949
F: 3 August/24 August 1949
Paris treaties: ECSC and EDC (Note: Plans to establish a European Political Community (EPC) were shelved following the French failure to ratify the Treaty establishing the European Defence Community (EDC). The EPC would have combined the ECSC and the EDC.)
S: 18 April 1951/27 May 1952
F: 23 July 1952/—
E: 23 July 2002/—
Protocol Modifying and
Completing the Brussels Treaty
S: 23 October 1954
F: 6 May 1955
Rome treaties: EEC and EAEC
S: 25 March 1957
F: 1 January 1958
WEU-CoE agreement
S: 21 October 1959
F: 1 January 1960
Brussels (Merger) Treaty (Note: The European Communities obtained common institutions and a shared legal personality (i.e. ability to e.g. sign treaties in their own right).)
S: 8 April 1965
F: 1 July 1967
Davignon report
S: 27 October 1970
European Council conclusions
S: 2 December 1975
Single European Act (SEA)
S: 17/28 February 1986
F: 1 July 1987
Schengen Treaty and Convention
S: 14 June 1985/19 June 1990
F: 26 March 1995
Maastricht Treaty (Note: The treaties of Maastricht and Rome form the EU's legal basis, and are also referred to as the Treaty on European Union (TEU) and the Treaty on the Functioning of the European Union (TFEU), respectively. They are amended by secondary treaties.) (Note: Between the EU's founding in 1993 and consolidation in 2009, the union consisted of three pillars, the first of which were the European Communities. The other two pillars consisted of additional areas of cooperation that had been added to the EU's remit.)
S: 7 February 1992
F: 1 November 1993
Amsterdam Treaty
S: 2 October 1997
F: 1 May 1999
Nice Treaty
S: 26 February 2001
F: 1 February 2003
Lisbon Treaty (Note: The consolidation meant that the EU inherited the European Communities' legal personality and that the pillar system was abolished, resulting in the EU framework as such covering all policy areas. Executive/legislative power in each area was instead determined by a distribution of competencies between EU institutions and member states. This distribution, as well as treaty provisions for policy areas in which unanimity is required and qualified majority voting is possible, reflects the depth of EU integration as well as the EU's partly supranational and partly intergovernmental nature.)
S: 13 December 2007
F: 1 December 2009

== See also ==
- History of the European Union
