= Western European Union =

1954–2011 international organisation and military alliance

Western European Union Union de l'Europe occidentale
- 1954–2011
- Flag (1995–2011)

- Status: Alliance
- Capital: Brussels
- Historical era: Cold War
  - Modified Brussels Treaty: 23 October 1954
  - Cultural tasks transf. to CoE: 1 January 1960
  - Rome Declaration: 27 October 1984
  - Platform on European Security Interests: 27 October 1987
  - Petersberg Declaration: 19 June 1992
  - ESDI introduced: 4 June 1996
  - Treaty of Lisbon: 1 December 2009
  - Abolition: 30 June 2011
Preceded by	Succeeded by
Western Union (alliance)	European Union
- Today part of: European Union (CSDP); Council of Europe

The Western European Union (WEU; French: Union de l'Europe occidentale, UEO; German: Westeuropäische Union, WEU) was the international organisation and military alliance that succeeded the Western Union (WU) after the 1954 amendment of the 1948 Treaty of Brussels. The WEU implemented the Modified Brussels Treaty. During the Cold War, the Western Bloc included the WEU member-states, plus the United States and Canada, as part of the North Atlantic Treaty Organization (NATO).

The Cold War ended c. 1991, and at the turn of the 21st century, WEU tasks and institutions were gradually transferred to the European Union (EU), providing central parts of the EU's new military component, the European Common Security and Defence Policy (CSDP). This process was completed in 2009 when a solidarity clause between the member states of the European Union, which was similar (but not identical) to the WEU's mutual-defence clause, entered into force with the Treaty of Lisbon. The states party to the Modified Treaty of Brussels consequently decided to terminate that treaty on 31 March 2010, with all the WEU's remaining activities to cease within 15 months. On 30 June 2011, the WEU officially ceased to exist; with the European Union taking over its activities.

== History ==
=== Background ===
The Treaty of Brussels was signed by the United Kingdom, France, Belgium, Luxembourg, and the Netherlands on 17 March 1948, establishing the Western Union (WU), an intergovernmental defence alliance that also promoted economic, cultural and social collaboration.

The need to back up the commitments of the North Atlantic Treaty with appropriate political and military structures led to the creation of the North Atlantic Treaty Organisation (NATO). In December 1950 the parties to the Treaty of Brussels decided to transfer the headquarters, personnel, and plans of the Western Union Defence Organisation (WUDO) to NATO, whose Supreme Headquarters Allied Powers Europe (SHAPE) took over responsibility for the defence of Western Europe.

The establishment of NATO, along with the signing of a succession of treaties establishing the Organisation for European Economic Cooperation (April 1948), the North Atlantic Treaty Organisation (April 1949), the Council of Europe (May 1949) and the European Coal and Steel Community (April 1951), left the Treaty of Brussels and its Western Union devoid of authority.

=== 1954–1984: General dormancy ===
First, 9-star flag (1993–1995)

The General Treaty (German: Deutschlandvertrag) of 1952 formally named the European Defence Community as a prerequisite of the end of the Allied occupation of Germany, and there was a desire to include Germany in the Western defence architecture. As a result of the failure of France to ratify the treaty establishing the Community, the Treaty of Brussels was amended at the 1954 Paris Conference. The Modified Brussels Treaty (MBT) transformed the Western Union into the Western European Union, at which point Italy and West Germany were admitted. Although the WEU was significantly less powerful and ambitious than the original Western Union, German membership was considered sufficient for its occupation to end in accordance with the General Treaty.

The signatories of the Paris Agreements stated their three main objectives in the preamble to the Modified Brussels Treaty:

- To create in Western Europe a firm basis for European economic recovery;
- To afford assistance to each other in resisting any policy of aggression;
- To promote the unity and encourage the progressive integration of Europe.

The social and cultural aspects of the Treaty of Brussels were handed to the Council of Europe (CoE) to avoid duplication of responsibilities. This, in addition to the existence of NATO, marginalised the WEU, and caused it to be largely defunct.

On 1 January 1960, in accordance with the decision taken on 21 October 1959 by the Council of the Western European Union, and Resolution(59)23, adopted on 16 November 1959 by the Committee of Ministers of the Council of Europe, the WEU's activities in social and cultural areas (Social Committee, Public Health Committee, Joint Committee on the Rehabilitation and Resettlement of the Disabled and Cultural Committee) were transferred to the Council of Europe, already running programmes in these fields. The European Universities Committee (see CM(60)4; C(59)127 and CM(59)130) was separately transferred to the Council.

=== 1984–1998: Revival ===
From the late 1970s onwards, efforts were made to add a security dimension to the European Communities' European Political Cooperation (EPC), namely through the Genscher-Colombo Initiative. Opposition to these efforts from Denmark, Greece and Ireland led the remaining EC countries – all WEU members – to reactivate the WEU in 1984 by adopting the Rome Declaration. Prior to this point there had been minimal use of the provisions of the Modified Brussels Treaty.

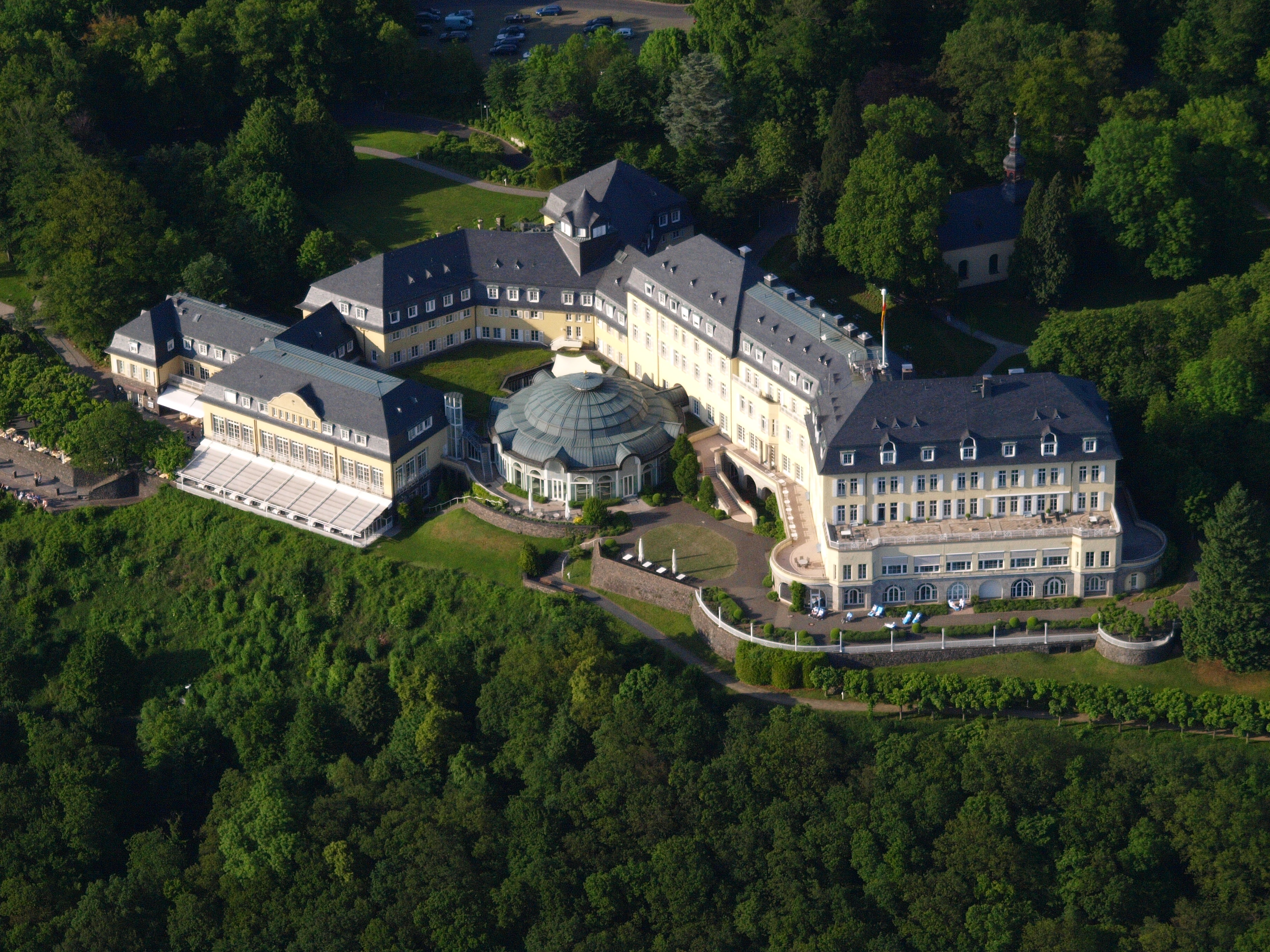
Hotel Petersberg, where the Petersberg tasks were defined in 1992.

In 1992, the WEU adopted the Petersberg Declaration, defining the so-called Petersberg tasks designed to cope with the possible destabilising of Eastern Europe. The WEU itself had no standing army but depended on cooperation between its members. Its tasks ranged from the most modest to the most robust, and included humanitarian, rescue and peacekeeping tasks as well as tasks for combat forces in crisis management, including peacemaking.

At the 1996 NATO ministerial meeting in Berlin, it was agreed that the Western European Union would oversee the creation of a European Security and Defence Identity (ESDI) within NATO structures. The ESDI was intended as a European 'pillar' within NATO, partly to allow European countries to act militarily where NATO wished not to, and partly to alleviate the United States' financial burden of maintaining military bases in Europe, which it had done since the Cold War. The Berlin agreement allowed European countries (through the WEU) to use NATO assets if it so wished.

=== 1998–2009: Transfer of tasks to the EU ===
In 1998 the United Kingdom, which had traditionally opposed the introduction of European autonomous defence capacities, signed the Saint-Malo declaration. This marked a turning point as the declaration endorsed the creation of a European security and defense policy, including a European military force capable of autonomous action. The declaration was a response to the Kosovo War in the late 1990s, in which the EU was perceived to have failed to intervene to stop the conflict.

Concerns were voiced that an independent European security pillar could undermine NATO; In response to St. Malo, the former US-Secretary of State Madeleine Albright put forth the three famous D's: no duplication of what was done effectively under NATO, no decoupling from the US and NATO, and no discrimination against non-EU members such as Turkey.

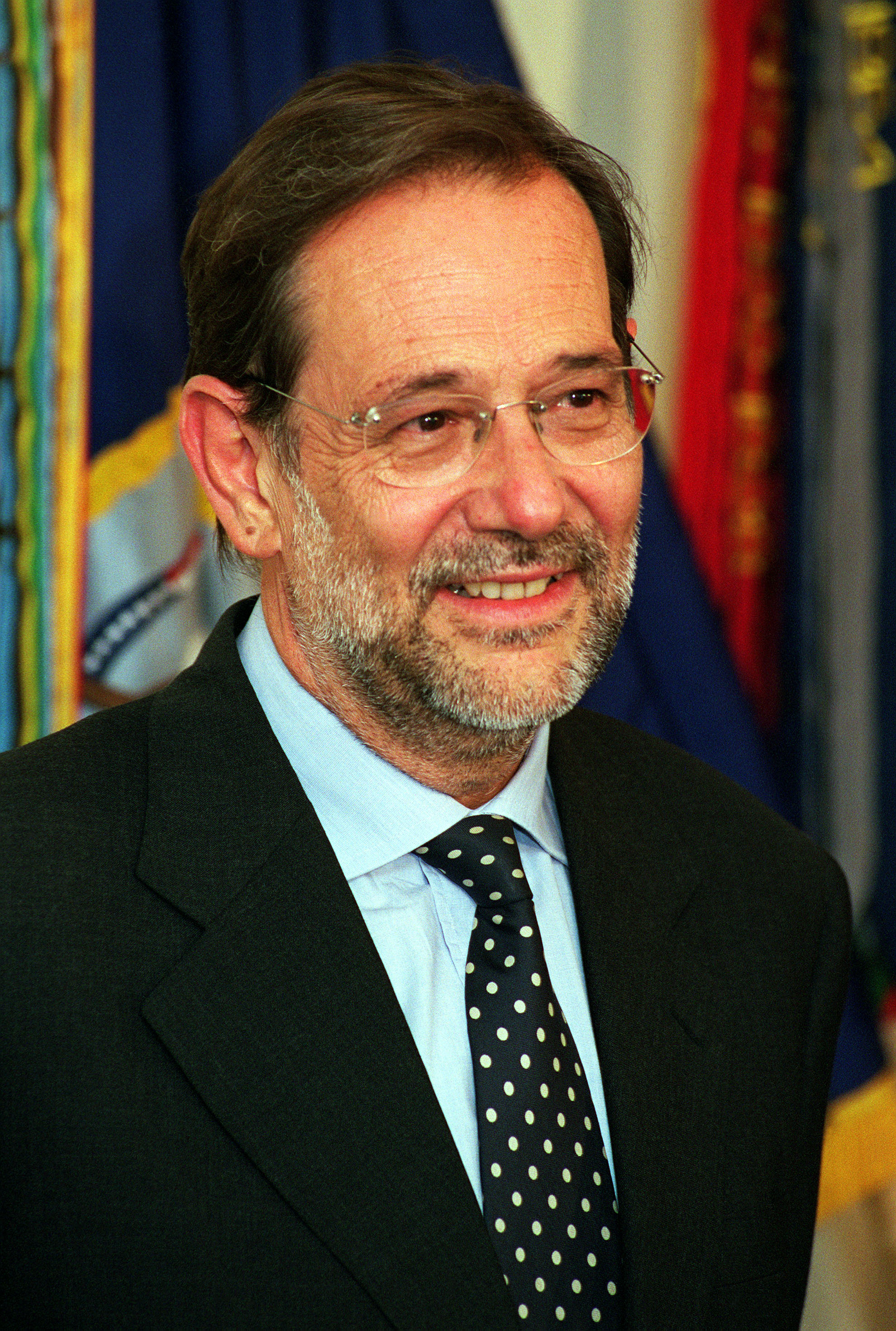
High Representative Javier Solana (September 1999)

The Treaty of Amsterdam, which entered into force in 1999, transferred the WEU's Petersberg tasks to the EU, and stated that the EU's Common Security and Defence Policy (CSDP), replacing the WEU's ESDI, would be 'progressively framed' on the basis of these tasks.

In June 1999, the Cologne European Council decided to incorporate the role of the WEU within the EU, effectively abandoning the WEU. The Cologne Council also appointed Javier Solana as the High Representative for Common Foreign and Security Policy to help progress both the CFSP and the CSDP. On 20 November 1999 Solana was also appointed Secretary-General of the WEU. His being head of both organisations permits him to oversee the ongoing transfer of functions from the WEU to the EU.

In 2002 the Berlin agreement from 1996 was amended with the so-called Berlin Plus agreement, which allowed the EU to also draw on some of NATO's assets in its own peacekeeping operations.

Originally, under the Amsterdam Treaty, the WEU was given an integral role in giving the EU an independent defence capability, playing a major role in the Petersberg tasks; however that situation is changing. On 13 November 2000, WEU Ministers met in Marseille and agreed to begin transferring the organisation's capabilities and functions to the European Union, under its developing Common Foreign and Security Policy (CFSP) and Common Security and Defence Policy (CSDP).

For example, on 1 January 2002, the WEU's Security Studies Institute and the Satellite Centre were transferred to the EU and became the European Union Institute for Security Studies and the European Union Satellite Centre. Notably, the role given to the WEU in the Amsterdam Treaty, was removed by the Nice Treaty. The Treaty of Lisbon has provisions for cooperation between the EU and both NATO (including the Berlin Plus agreement) and the WEU. However the defence commitment, of Article 4 of the Brussels Treaty, has not been subsumed. Article 42(7) of the Treaty of the European Union, as amended by the Treaty of Lisbon, could be viewed as incorporating that defence commitment into the EU framework.

The European Union Institute for Security Studies (EUISS) and European Union Satellite Centre (EUSC), both established to function under the EU's CFSP pillar, were both replacements to the Western European Union Institute for Security Studies and the Western Union Satellite Centre which had been established to function in connection to the WEU.

With the transfer of responsibilities, the WEU's Parliamentary assembly was urged to dissolve itself, as it had a mandate to supervise WEU politics, not the EU's CSDP politics. But the Assembly saw itself as playing an important role, particularly with greater right of scrutiny, membership, experience and expertise in defence policy. Therefore, it renamed itself the "Interim European Security and Defence Assembly" and urged the European Convention to include it as a second chamber within the EU's institutional framework. Hence it argued it could effectively scrutinise the CSDP, help improve EU-NATO relations and be more suited, being composed of national parliamentarians, to the intergovernmental style of the CSDP.

However, with the European Constitution aiming to streamline and simplify the EU's foreign policy, for example combining the two main foreign policy posts, it was not seen as wise to then create a separate double legislature for the CFSP, instead, the European Parliament was granted greater scrutiny over foreign policy.

=== 2009–2011: Dissolution ===
In 2009, the Treaty of Lisbon took over the WEU's mutual defence clause. There was much discussion about what to do with the WEU following the introduction of Lisbon, including plans to scrap it. On 30 March 2010 in a Written Ministerial Statement UK's Foreign Office Minister Chris Bryant gave notice that the UK intended to withdraw from the Western European Union within a year. On 31 March 2010 the German Foreign Affairs Ministry announced Germany's intention to withdraw from the Modified Brussels Treaty. That same year, the Spanish Presidency of the WEU, on behalf of the 10 Member States of the Modified Brussels Treaty, announced the collective decision to withdraw from the Treaty and to close the WEU organisation by June 2011. On 30 June 2011 the WEU officially ceased to exist.

=== Timeline ===
Since the end of World War II, most sovereign European countries have entered into treaties and thereby co-operated and harmonised policies (or pooled sovereignty) in an increasing number of areas, in the European integration project or the construction of Europe (French: la construction européenne). The following timeline outlines the legal inception of the European Union (EU) — the principal framework for this unification. The EU inherited many of its present organisations, institutions and responsibilities from the European Communities (EC), which were founded in the 1950s in the spirit of the Schuman Declaration.

Legend:
S: signing
F: entry into force
T: termination
E: expiry
de facto supersession
Rel. w/ EC/EU framework:
de facto inside
outside

European Union (EU)
[Cont.]
European Communities (EC)
(Pillar I)

European Atomic Energy Community (EAEC or EURATOM)

[Cont.]

/ / / European Coal and Steel Community (ECSC)

(Distr. of competences)

European Economic Community (EEC)

Schengen Rules
European Community (EC)
TREVI
Justice and Home Affairs (JHA, pillar III)

/ North Atlantic Treaty Organisation (NATO)
[Cont.]
Police and Judicial Co-operation in Criminal Matters (PJCC, pillar III)

Anglo-French alliance
[Defence arm handed to NATO]
European Political Co-operation (EPC)

Common Foreign and Security Policy
(CFSP, pillar II)
Western Union (WU)
/ Western European Union (WEU)
[Tasks defined following the WEU's 1984 reactivation handed to the EU]

[Social, cultural tasks handed to CoE]
[Cont.]

Council of Europe (CoE)
Entente Cordiale
S: 8 April 1904
Dunkirk Treaty (Note: Although not EU treaties per se, these treaties affected the development of the EU defence arm, a main part of the CFSP. The Franco-British alliance established by the Dunkirk Treaty was de facto superseded by WU. The CFSP pillar was bolstered by some of the security structures that had been established within the remit of the 1955 Modified Brussels Treaty (MBT). The Brussels Treaty was terminated in 2011, consequently dissolving the WEU, as the mutual defence clause that the Lisbon Treaty provided for EU was considered to render the WEU superfluous. The EU thus de facto superseded the WEU.)
S: 4 March 1947
F: 8 September 1947
E: 8 September 1997
Brussels Treaty
S: 17 March 1948
F: 25 August 1948
T: 30 June 2011
London and Washington treaties
S: 5 May/4 April 1949
F: 3 August/24 August 1949
Paris treaties: ECSC and EDC (Note: Plans to establish a European Political Community (EPC) were shelved following the French failure to ratify the Treaty establishing the European Defence Community (EDC). The EPC would have combined the ECSC and the EDC.)
S: 18 April 1951/27 May 1952
F: 23 July 1952/?
E: 23 July 2002/—
Protocol Modifying and
Completing the Brussels Treaty
S: 23 October 1954
F: 6 May 1955
Rome treaties: EEC and EAEC
S: 25 March 1957
F: 1 January 1958
WEU-CoE agreement
S: 21 October 1959
F: 1 January 1960
Brussels (Merger) Treaty (Note: The European Communities obtained common institutions and a shared legal personality (i.e. ability to e.g. sign treaties in their own right).)
S: 8 April 1965
F: 1 July 1967
Davignon report
S: 27 October 1970
European Council conclusions
S: 2 December 1975
Single European Act (SEA)
S: 17/28 February 1986
F: 1 July 1987
Schengen Agreement and Convention
S: 14 June 1985/19 June 1990
F: 26 March 1995
Maastricht Treaty (Note: The treaties of Maastricht and Rome form the EU's legal basis, and are also referred to as the Treaty on European Union (TEU) and the Treaty on the Functioning of the European Union (TFEU), respectively. They are amended by secondary treaties.) (Note: Between the EU's founding in 1993 and consolidation in 2009, the union consisted of three pillars, the first of which were the European Communities. The other two pillars consisted of additional areas of cooperation that had been added to the EU's remit.)
S: 7 February 1992
F: 1 November 1993
Amsterdam Treaty
S: 2 October 1997
F: 1 May 1999
Nice Treaty
S: 26 February 2001
F: 1 February 2003
Lisbon Treaty (Note: The consolidation meant that the EU inherited the European Communities' legal personality and that the pillar system was abolished, resulting in the EU framework as such covering all policy areas. Executive/legislative power in each area was instead determined by a distribution of competencies between EU institutions and member states. This distribution, as well as treaty provisions for policy areas in which unanimity is required and qualified majority voting is possible, reflects the depth of EU integration as well as the EU's partly supranational and partly intergovernmental nature.)
S: 13 December 2007
F: 1 December 2009

== Organization ==
The WEU was headquartered in Brussels, with a staff of 65 and an annual budget of €13.4 million. It was composed of the Council of the WEU (the Council) and the Assembly of the WEU (the Assembly).

=== Council of Ministers ===
The WEU was led by a Council of Ministers, assisted by a Permanent Representatives Council on the ambassadorial level.

=== Parliamentary Assembly ===
Flag of the WEU Assembly

A Parliamentary Assembly (composed of the delegations of the member states to the Parliamentary Assembly of the Council of Europe) supervised the work of the Council, but it did not have any obligations on the Council. The Assembly of WEU was a consultative institution.

=== Western European Armaments Group ===
WEAG emblem

The Independent European Program Group (IEPG) was established as a forum for armaments cooperation in 1976 with the aim of creating a European Armaments Agency. Since 1993 the WEU armaments cooperation forum has been known as Western European Armaments Group (WEAG). Its membership reached 19 in 2000: Austria, Belgium, Czech Republic, Denmark, Finland, France, Germany, Greece, Hungary, Italy, Luxembourg, Netherlands, Norway, Poland, Portugal, Spain, Sweden, Turkey and the United Kingdom. The body closed on 23 May 2005.

=== Western European Armaments Organisation ===
The Western European Armaments Organisation (WEAO) was intended as an Armaments Agency but operations were limited to a research cell. It provided support services in defence research and technology. It was created in 1996, and closed in August 2006. These agencies were taken over by the European Defence Agency. Other transferred bodies include the Institute for Security Studies and the Satellite Centre.

=== European Operational Rapid Force ===
Arms of the European Rapid Operational Force

On 15 May 1995, the Council of Ministers of the WEU met in Lisbon. During this meeting a declaration of the creation of the European Operational Rapid Force (EUROFOR) was made by France, Italy, Spain and Portugal. Eurofor became operational in June 1998 as a task force of the Western European Union.

== Participation ==
WEU participation as of 2011: Members; Associate members; Observers; Associate partners

The Western European Union had ten member countries, six associate member countries, five observer countries and seven associate partner countries. On 14 June 2001, WEU Secretary General Solana stated that there was no foreseeable reason to change the status of the non member countries in the organisation.

=== Members ===
All member countries of the WEU were also members of both NATO and the European Union. These are the only nations that had full voting rights.

- Belgium
- France
- Germany
- Greece (1995)
- Italy
- Luxembourg
- Netherlands
- Portugal (27 March 1990)
- Spain (27 March 1990)
- United Kingdom

=== Observers ===
Rome, 1992: Observer countries were members of the European Union, but not of NATO.^{1}

- Austria (1995)
- Denmark^{1}
- Finland (1995)
- Ireland
- Sweden (1995)

^{1} Denmark was an exception, being member of both. It has an opt-out from the Treaty of Maastricht (1992), so that it did not participate in the CSDP of the European Union.

=== Associate members ===
Rome, 1992: Associate membership was created to include the European countries that were members of NATO but not of the European Union. Associate members Poland, the Czech Republic and Hungary joined the EU in 2004.

- Czech Republic (1999)
- Hungary (1999)
- Iceland
- Norway
- Poland (1999)
- Turkey (1992)

=== Associate partners ===
Kirchberg, 1994: Countries that at the time were not part of either NATO or of the EU. All of the following nations joined both NATO and the EU by 2007.

- Bulgaria
- Estonia
- Latvia
- Lithuania
- Romania
- Slovakia
- Slovenia (1996)

== Missions ==
The following missions, mainly in the Balkans, were deployed by the WEU:

- 1987–1988: Operation Cleansweep: A minesweeping operation in the Strait of Hormuz
- June 1993–October 1996: Operation Sharp Guard: A joint naval operation with NATO in the Adriatic Sea
- June 1993–October 1996: A police and customs operation with the Organization for Security and Co-operation in Europe (OSCE) on the Danube
- July 1994–October 1996: A police contingent in Mostar, Bosnia-Herzegovina
- May 1997–May 2001: A Multinational Advisory Police Element (MAPE) in Albania
- May 1999–November 2001: A Demining Assistance Mission (WEUDAM) to Croatia
- November 1998–July 1999: A general security surveillance mission in Kosovo

== Non-military activities ==
The WEU initially had cultural and social (non-military) structures and activities, but these were transferred to the Council of Europe in 1960.

== See also ==
- Collective defence
- Collective security
- European Union Institute for Security Studies
- Exercise Verity
- History of the Common Security and Defence Policy
- Lancaster House Treaties
- List of military alliances
- List of secretaries general of the Western European Union
