= Treaty of Amsterdam =

1997 treaty amending the treaty of the European Union

Treaty of Amsterdam amending the Treaty on European Union, the Treaties establishing the European Communities and certain related acts
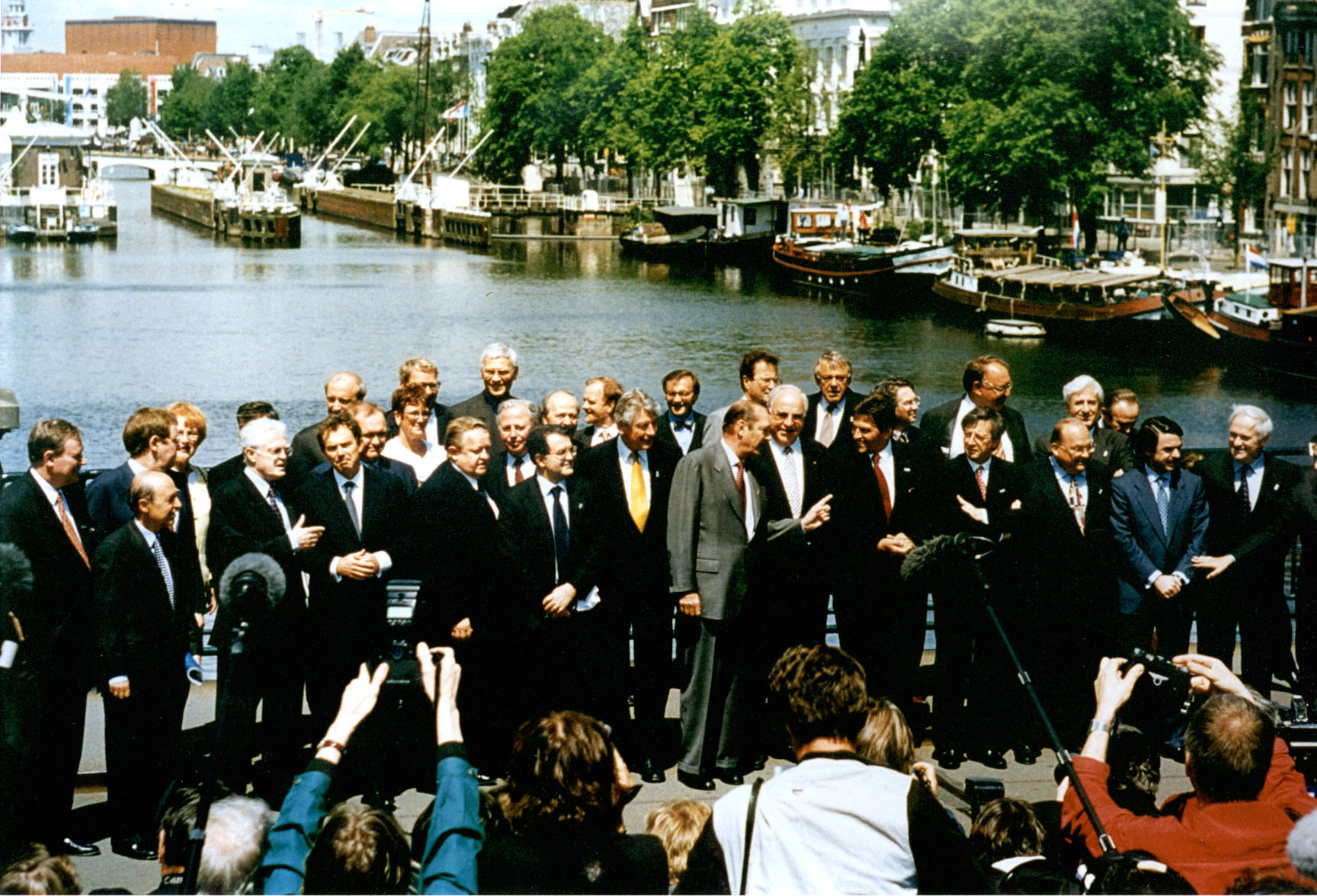
- European leaders in Amsterdam, June 1997.
- Type: Amender of the TEU, the TEC, the TEAEC, and the TECSC
- Signed: 2 October 1997
- Location: Amsterdam, Netherlands
- Effective: 1 May 1999
- Signatories: 15 EU member states: Austria; Belgium; Denmark; Finland; France; Germany; Greece; Ireland; Italy; Luxembourg; Netherlands; Portugal; Spain; Sweden; United Kingdom
- Depositary: Government of Italy
- Citations: Prior amendment treaty: Maastricht Treaty (1992); Subsequent amendment treaty: Nice Treaty (2001)
- Languages: 12 EU languages: Danish; Dutch; English; Finnish; French; German; Greek; Irish; Italian; Portuguese; Spanish; Swedish

Full text
- Treaty of Amsterdam at Wikisource
- After amendments made by the Amsterdam Treaty: Consolidated version of EURATOM treaty (1997) Consolidated version of the ECSC treaty (1997) Consolidated version of TEC (1997) Consolidated version of TEU (1997)

The Treaty of Amsterdam, officially the Treaty of Amsterdam amending the Treaty on European Union, the Treaties establishing the European Communities and certain related acts, was signed on 2 October 1997, and entered into force on 1 May 1999; it made substantial changes to the Maastricht Treaty, which had been signed in 1992.

Under the Treaty of Amsterdam, member states agreed to transfer certain powers from national governments to the European Parliament across diverse areas, including legislating on immigration, adopting civil and criminal laws in areas of shared and exclusive competency, and enacting common foreign and security policy (CFSP), as well as implementing institutional changes for expansion as new member nations join the EU.

== Background ==
The treaty was the result of long negotiations which began in Messina, Italy, on 2 June 1995, nearly forty years after the signing of the Treaty of Rome, and reached completion in Amsterdam on 18 June 1997. Following the formal signing of the Treaty on 2 October 1997, the member states engaged in an equally long and complex ratification process. The European Parliament endorsed the treaty on 19 November 1997, and after two referendums and 13 decisions by parliaments, the member states finally concluded the procedure.

== Contents ==
The Treaty of Amsterdam comprises 13 protocols, 51 declarations adopted by the Conference, and eight declarations by member states, plus amendments to the existing treaties set out in 15 articles. Article 1 (containing 16 paragraphs) amends the general provisions of the Treaty on European Union and covers the CFSP and cooperation in criminal and police matters. The next four articles (70 paragraphs) amend the EC Treaty, the European Coal and Steel Community Treaty (which expired in 2002), the Euratom Treaty, and the Act concerning the election of the European Parliament. The final provisions contain four articles. The new treaty also set out to simplify the Community Treaties, deleting more than 56 obsolete articles and renumbering the rest in order to make the whole more legible. By way of example, Article 189b on the codecision procedure became Article 251.

The most pressing concerns of ordinary Europeans, such as their legal and personal security, immigration, and fraud prevention, were all dealt with in other chapters of the treaty. In particular, the EU became responsible for legislating on immigration, civil law or civil procedure, insofar as this is necessary for the free movement of persons within the EU. At the same time, intergovernmental co-operation was intensified in the police and criminal justice field so that member states should be able to coordinate their activities more effectively. The Union aims to establish an area of freedom, security and justice for its citizens. The Schengen Agreements have now been incorporated into the legal system of the EU (Ireland remains outside the Schengen agreement due to its open border with the United Kingdom, see Common Travel Area for details).

The treaty lays down new principles and responsibilities in the field of the common foreign and security policy, with the emphasis on projecting the EU's values to the outside world, protecting its interests, and reforming its modes of action. The European Council will lay down common strategies, which will then be put into effect by the Council acting by a qualified majority, subject to certain conditions. In other cases, some member states may choose to abstain "constructively", i.e. without actually preventing actions being taken.

The treaty introduced a High Representative for EU Foreign Policy who, together with the Presidents of the Council and the European Commission, puts a "name and a face" on EU policy to the outside world. Although the Amsterdam Treaty did not provide for a common defence, it did increase the EU's responsibilities for peacekeeping and humanitarian work, in particular by forging closer links with Western European Union.

=== Institutions ===
As for the institutions, there were two major reforms concerning the co-decision procedure (the legislative procedure involving the European Parliament and the council), affecting its scope—most legislation was adopted by the co-decision procedure—and its detailed procedures, with the parliament playing a much stronger role. The President of the commission will also have to earn the personal trust of the parliament, which will give them the authority to lay down the commission's policy guidelines and play an active part in choosing the Members of the commission by deciding on their appointment by common accord with the national governments. These provisions make the Commission more politically accountable, particularly vis-à-vis the European Parliament. Finally, the new Treaty enables, under very strict conditions, closer co-operation between member states which so wish. Closer co-operation may be established, on a proposal from the commission, in cases where it is not possible to take joint action, provided that such steps do not undermine the coherence of the EU or the rights and equality of its citizens.

== Challenges ==
The Amsterdam Treaty did not settle all institutional questions. Work was still in progress on reforming the institutions to make them capable of operating effectively and democratically in a much enlarged EU. The most pressing issues were the composition of the commission and the weighting of member states' votes upon qualified majority voting. These questions were addressed in the Lisbon Treaty.

== Signatures ==
Erik Derycke (Belgium) Belgian Minister of Foreign Affairs

Niels Helveg Petersen (Denmark) Danish Minister of Foreign Affairs

Tarja Halonen (Finland) Finnish Minister for Foreign Affairs

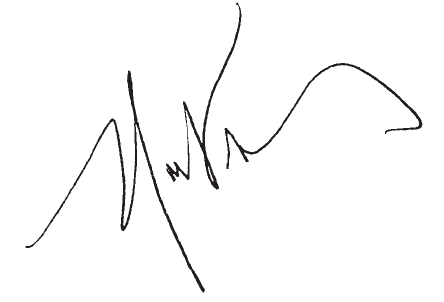
Hubert Védrine (France) French Minister of Foreign Affairs

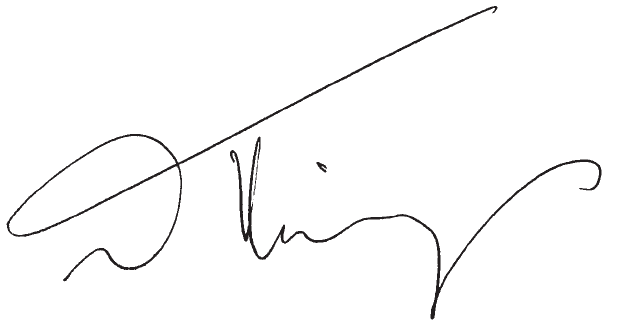
Theodoros Pangalos (Greece) Greek Minister for Foreign Affairs

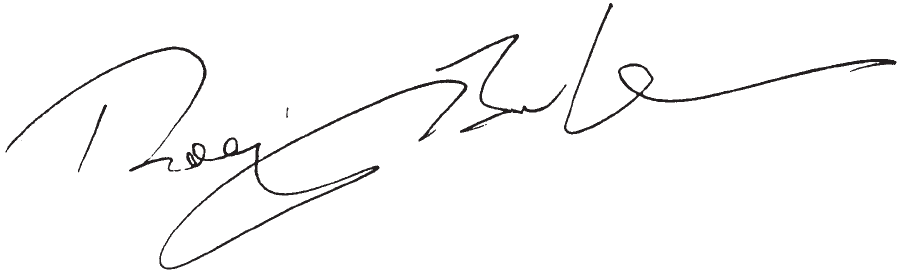
Ray Burke (Republic of Ireland) Irish Minister for Foreign Affairs

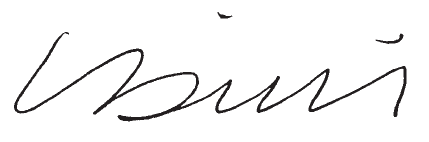
Lamberto Dini (Italy) Italian Minister of Foreign Affairs

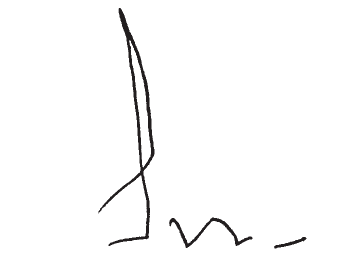
Jacques Poos (Luxembourg) Luxembourgish Minister for Foreign Affairs

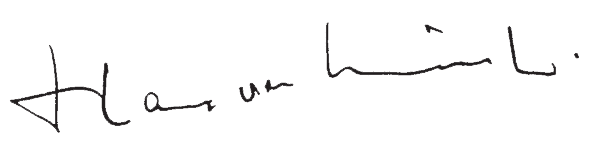
Hans van Mierlo (Netherlands) Dutch Minister of Foreign Affairs

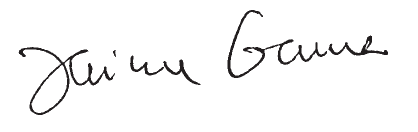
Jaime Gama (Portugal) Portuguese Minister of Foreign Affairs

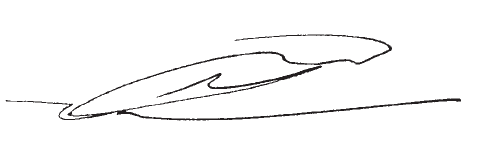
Abel Matutes (Spain) Spanish Minister of Foreign Affairs

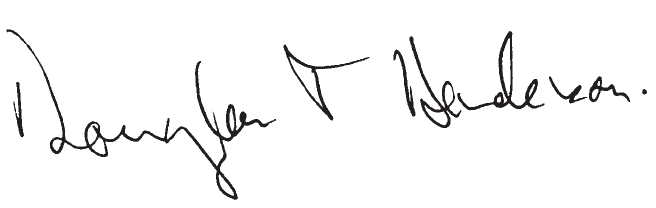
Doug Henderson (United Kingdom) British Minister of State for Europe

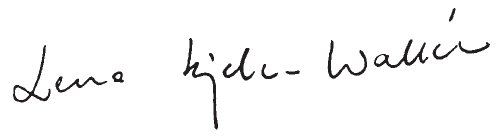
Lena Hjelm-Wallén (Sweden) Swedish Minister for Foreign Affairs

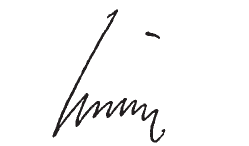
Klaus Kinkel (Germany) German Minister of Foreign Affairs

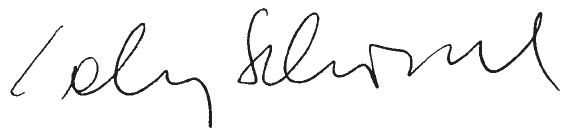
Wolfgang Schüssel (Austria) Austrian Minister of Foreign Affairs

=== Withdrawal ===
On 31 January 2020, the United Kingdom left the European Union and so withdrew from the treaty.

== EU evolution timeline ==
Since the end of World War II, most sovereign European countries have entered into treaties and thereby co-operated and harmonised policies (or pooled sovereignty) in an increasing number of areas, in the European integration project or the construction of Europe (French: la construction européenne). The following timeline outlines the legal inception of the European Union (EU)—the principal framework for this unification. The EU inherited many of its present organisations, institutions, and responsibilities from the European Communities (EC), which were founded in the 1950s in the spirit of the Schuman Declaration.

Legend:
S: signing
F: entry into force
T: termination
E: expiry
de facto supersession
Rel. w/ EC/EU framework:
de facto inside
outside

European Union (EU)
[Cont.]
European Communities (EC)
(Pillar I)

European Atomic Energy Community (EAEC or EURATOM)

[Cont.]

/ / / European Coal and Steel Community (ECSC)

(Distr. of competences)

European Economic Community (EEC)

Schengen Rules
European Community (EC)
TREVI
Justice and Home Affairs (JHA, pillar III)

/ North Atlantic Treaty Organisation (NATO)
[Cont.]
Police and Judicial Co-operation in Criminal Matters (PJCC, pillar III)

Anglo-French alliance
[Defence arm handed to NATO]
European Political Co-operation (EPC)

Common Foreign and Security Policy
(CFSP, pillar II)
Western Union (WU)
/ Western European Union (WEU)
[Tasks defined following the WEU's 1984 reactivation handed to the EU]

[Social, cultural tasks handed to CoE]
[Cont.]

Council of Europe (CoE)
Entente Cordiale
S: 8 April 1904
Dunkirk Treaty (Note: Although not EU treaties per se, these treaties affected the development of the EU defence arm, a main part of the CFSP. The Franco-British alliance established by the Dunkirk Treaty was de facto superseded by WU. The CFSP pillar was bolstered by some of the security structures that had been established within the remit of the 1955 Modified Brussels Treaty (MBT). The Brussels Treaty was terminated in 2011, consequently dissolving the WEU, as the mutual defence clause that the Lisbon Treaty provided for EU was considered to render the WEU superfluous. The EU thus de facto superseded the WEU.)
S: 4 March 1947
F: 8 September 1947
E: 8 September 1997
Brussels Treaty
S: 17 March 1948
F: 25 August 1948
T: 30 June 2011
London and Washington treaties
S: 5 May/4 April 1949
F: 3 August/24 August 1949
Paris treaties: ECSC and EDC (Note: Plans to establish a European Political Community (EPC) were shelved following the French failure to ratify the Treaty establishing the European Defence Community (EDC). The EPC would have combined the ECSC and the EDC.)
S: 18 April 1951/27 May 1952
F: 23 July 1952/?
E: 23 July 2002/—
Protocol Modifying and
Completing the Brussels Treaty
S: 23 October 1954
F: 6 May 1955
Rome treaties: EEC and EAEC
S: 25 March 1957
F: 1 January 1958
WEU-CoE agreement
S: 21 October 1959
F: 1 January 1960
Brussels (Merger) Treaty (Note: The European Communities obtained common institutions and a shared legal personality (i.e. ability to e.g. sign treaties in their own right).)
S: 8 April 1965
F: 1 July 1967
Davignon report
S: 27 October 1970
European Council conclusions
S: 2 December 1975
Single European Act (SEA)
S: 17/28 February 1986
F: 1 July 1987
Schengen Agreement and Convention
S: 14 June 1985/19 June 1990
F: 26 March 1995
Maastricht Treaty (Note: The treaties of Maastricht and Rome form the EU's legal basis, and are also referred to as the Treaty on European Union (TEU) and the Treaty on the Functioning of the European Union (TFEU), respectively. They are amended by secondary treaties.) (Note: Between the EU's founding in 1993 and consolidation in 2009, the union consisted of three pillars, the first of which were the European Communities. The other two pillars consisted of additional areas of cooperation that had been added to the EU's remit.)
S: 7 February 1992
F: 1 November 1993
Amsterdam Treaty
S: 2 October 1997
F: 1 May 1999
Nice Treaty
S: 26 February 2001
F: 1 February 2003
Lisbon Treaty (Note: The consolidation meant that the EU inherited the European Communities' legal personality and that the pillar system was abolished, resulting in the EU framework as such covering all policy areas. Executive/legislative power in each area was instead determined by a distribution of competencies between EU institutions and member states. This distribution, as well as treaty provisions for policy areas in which unanimity is required and qualified majority voting is possible, reflects the depth of EU integration as well as the EU's partly supranational and partly intergovernmental nature.)
S: 13 December 2007
F: 1 December 2009

== See also ==
- Common Travel Area
- Enhanced cooperation
- Schengen Agreement
