= Single European Act =

Revision to the Treaty of Rome

Single European Act
- Type: Amending treaty
- Signed: 17 February 1986; 28 February 1986
- Location: Luxembourg City, Luxembourg; The Hague, Netherlands
- Effective: 1 July 1987
- Parties: EU member states
- Depositary: Government of Italy
- Citations: Prior amendment treaty: Merger Treaty (1965); Subsequent amendment treaty: Maastricht Treaty (1992)
- Languages: 10: Danish; Dutch; English; French; German; Greek; Irish; Italian; Portuguese; Spanish

Full text
- Single European Act at Wikisource
- After amendments made by the SEA Treaty: Consolidated version of EURATOM treaty (1986) Consolidated version of the ECSC treaty (1986) Consolidated version of TEEC (1986)

The Single European Act (SEA) was the first major revision of the 1957 Treaty of Rome. The Act set the European Community an objective of establishing a single market by 31 December 1992, and as a forerunner of the European Union's Common Foreign and Security Policy (CFSP), it helped codify European Political Co-operation. The amending treaty was signed at Luxembourg City on 17 February 1986 and at The Hague on 28 February 1986. It came into effect on 1 July 1987, under the Delors Commission.

A core element of the SEA was to create a single market within the European Community by 1992, when – it was hoped – the necessary legislative reforms would have been completed. The belief was that in removing non-tariff barriers to cross-border intra-Community trade and investment such measures would provide the twelve Member States a broad economic stimulus. To facilitate their removal, the SEA reformed the Community legislative process both by introducing the cooperation procedure and by extending Qualified Majority Voting to new areas. Measures were also taken to shorten the legislative process.

Anticipating the 1992 Maastricht Treaty, the SEA signatories declared themselves "moved by the will to continue the work undertaken on the basis of the Treaties establishing the European Communities and to transform relations as a whole among their States into a European Union".

== Background ==
The SEA's signing grew from the discontent among European Community members in the 1980s about the de facto lack of free trade among them. Leaders from business and politics wanted to harmonise laws among countries and resolve policy discrepancies.

The Treaty was drafted with the aim of implementing parts of the Dooge report on institutional reform of the Community and the European Commission's white paper on reforming the Common Market. The resultant treaty aimed to create a "Single Market" in the Community by 1992, and as a means of achieving this adopted a more collaborative legislative process, later known as the cooperation procedure, which gave the European Parliament a real say in legislating for the first time and introduced more majority voting in the Council of Ministers. Under the procedure the Council could, with the support of Parliament and acting on a proposal by the Commission, adopt a legislative proposal by a qualified majority, but the Council could also overrule a rejection of a proposed law by the Parliament by adopting a proposal unanimously.

== Signing and ratification ==
A political agreement was reached at the European Council held in Luxembourg on 3 December 1985 when foreign ministers finalised the text. Denmark and Italy raised concerns over constitutional validity. Nine countries, Belgium, the Federal Republic of Germany (FRG), France, Ireland, Luxembourg, the Netherlands, Portugal, Spain, and the United Kingdom, signed the Single European Act at Luxembourg on 17 February 1986. That date was originally intended as display of unity within the Community regarding the SEA, but this failed.

The Danish parliament rejected the Single European Act in January 1986 after an opposition motion calling for the then unsigned document to be renegotiated was passed by 80 votes to 75. The Danish opposition opposed the treaty because they said it would increase the powers of the European Parliament. The Danish government, who supported the treaty, decided to hold a national, non-binding referendum on the issue to overcome the treaty's rejection by the Danish parliament. This referendum was duly held on 27 February 1986 and approved by the Danish people by 56.2% voting in favour to 43.8% against on a turnout of 75.4%.

The Italian government delayed in signing for the opposite concern: that, in their opinion, it would not give the European Parliament enough power. Together with Greece who had also delayed in signing, Denmark and Italy signed the Single European Act at The Hague on 28 February 1986.

It had been originally intended to have the SEA ratified by the end of 1986 so that it would come into force on 1 January 1987 and 11 of the then 12 member states of the EEC had ratified the treaty by that date. The deadline failed to be achieved when the Irish government were restrained from ratifying the SEA pending court proceedings.

In the court case Crotty v. An Taoiseach, the Irish Supreme Court ruled that the Irish Constitution would have to be amended before the state could ratify the treaty, something that can only be done by referendum. Such a referendum was ultimately held on 26 May 1987 when the proposal was approved by Irish voters, who voted by 69.9% in favour to 30.1% against, on a turnout of 44.1%. Ireland formally ratified the Single European Act in June 1987, allowing the treaty to come into force on 1 July.

== The employment promise of the Act ==
The Treaty was broadly promoted on the promise that trade liberalisation would renew employment growth. While completion of the Community's internal market in 1992 might not "be enough to bring unemployment down to the low-water mark reached just before the [1973] oil crisis", EC Commission President Jacques Delors was confident that it would be "enough to reverse the trend".

At the time of ratification, the EC appeared to be "an island of uniquely high unemployment". Over 9% of the workforce (April 1992) was unemployed – over 2% more than the 7.1% in the United States and in a different league from the 2.2% jobless rate in Japan. In the latter half of the 1980s employment had increased at a faster rate in the Community that an any time since the 1950s, but the fact that unemployment bottomed out at 8.3% suggested to the EC Social Affairs Commissions, Vasso Papandreou, that joblessness had become endemic within the Community.

Employment growth did figure prominently in "the rhetoric of '1992'". The official Cecchini Report identified employment gains as the Single Market's "most important benefit". But there were important caveats. First it was anticipated that intensified cross-border rationalisation and competition in the post-1992 market, in the short-term, might lead, if not to job losses, to a competitive devaluation of employment terms and conditions. Papandreou was persuaded that in the higher-wage economies, intensified cross-border competition and restructuring would result in a further splintering of working patterns and job contracts, increasing the incidence of part-time working, outwork, and temporary employment. Given that the model of full-time, regular employment continued to underlie social-security arrangements, this suggested the possibility of serious losses in welfare and equity.

A second reservation with regard to the employment benefits of the Single Market was that projections tended to assume a reversal, or at least easing, of the then relatively restrictive macro-economic policies of the member states. The Cecchini's Reports higher medium-term estimate of 4.4 million additional jobs resulting from the removal of the remaining barriers to intra-Community trade assumed that chief among the benefits of comprehensive trade liberalisation would be a spontaneous easing of inflationary pressures and external balance of payments constraints, and that the subsequent "room for manoeuvre" would be "exploited" by a resort to "expansionary economic policies".

The SEA committed the Member States to promote "the convergence of economic and monetary policies" necessary for European Currency Union (ECU). The criteria for economic and monetary union were left to the later 1992 Maastricht Treaty. The SEA did underscore that these should "take account of the experience acquired in co-operation within the framework of the European Monetary System (EMS)". The EMS linked the currencies of participating states, and committed their governments to fiscal and monetary policies sufficiently tight to contain inflation and prevent large exchange rate fluctuations. As the so-called "Maastricht criteria" were to confirm, this set a high bar before a government might consider expansionary policies to stimulate employment. It did not anticipate a mechanism for coordinating reflation between the member states so as to ease balance-of-trade constraints.

== UK interpretation and UK withdrawal ==
The United Kingdom, under the Conservative Party premiership of Margaret Thatcher, claimed credit for framing of the SEA. It was Thatcher's nominee to the Delors Commission, Lord Cockfield, who, as the commissioner responsible for the Single Market, drew up the initial White Paper.

For Thatcher, the Act represented the realisation of Britain's long-standing "free-trade" vision for Europe. Moving beyond the tariff-free commitment of the Common Market, the act would dismantle the "insidious" barriers to intra-Community trade posed by "differing national standards, various restrictions on the provision of services, [and the] exclusion of foreign firms from public contracts". To create a single market with purchasing power "bigger than Japan, bigger than the United States", Britain and her partners were committed to:

Action to make it possible for insurance companies to do business throughout the Community [for the British economy financial services played an outsized role]. Action to let people practice their trades and professions freely throughout the Community. Action to remove the customs barriers and formalities so that goods can circulate freely and without time-consuming delays. Action to make sure that any company could sell its goods and services without let or hindrance. Action to secure free movement of capital throughout the Community.

In promoting the Single Market, in the SEA Thatcher made compromises that a growing body of opinion in her Conservative Party were to regard as fatal. Pressured by German Chancellor Helmut Kohl she accepted the references, she had hoped to avoid, to a future European Union and to a common currency (monetary union).

Arguing that, building on these concessions the Maastricht and subsequent treaties, transcended the Single Market vision and committed Britain to an evolving "federal Europe", in 2015 Conservative "Euro-sceptics" secured a referendum on continued UK treaty accession. While presuming that Britain would remain "part" of a "European free trade zone from Iceland to the Russian border", the official Vote Leave campaign and its allies proved victorious in the "Brexit" referendum of June 2016. After rejecting calls to negotiate continued membership of the Single Market or a free-trade agreement based on regulatory alignment with the Single Market, under the terms of the October 2019 Withdrawal Agreement the Conservative government of Boris Johnson withdrew the United Kingdom from the European Union, and thus from the SEA, at the end of January 2020.

== Treaty time line ==
Since the end of World War II, most sovereign European countries have entered into treaties and thereby co-operated and harmonised policies (or pooled sovereignty) in an increasing number of areas, in the European integration project or the construction of Europe (French: la construction européenne). The following timeline outlines the legal inception of the European Union (EU) — the principal framework for this unification. The EU inherited many of its present organisations, institutions and responsibilities from the European Communities (EC), which were founded in the 1950s in the spirit of the Schuman Declaration.

Legend:
S: signing
F: entry into force
T: termination
E: expiry
de facto supersession
Rel. w/ EC/EU framework:
de facto inside
outside

European Union (EU)
[Cont.]
European Communities (EC)
(Pillar I)

European Atomic Energy Community (EAEC or EURATOM)

[Cont.]

/ / / European Coal and Steel Community (ECSC)

(Distr. of competences)

European Economic Community (EEC)

Schengen Rules
European Community (EC)
TREVI
Justice and Home Affairs (JHA, pillar III)

/ North Atlantic Treaty Organisation (NATO)
[Cont.]
Police and Judicial Co-operation in Criminal Matters (PJCC, pillar III)

Anglo-French alliance
[Defence arm handed to NATO]
European Political Co-operation (EPC)

Common Foreign and Security Policy
(CFSP, pillar II)
Western Union (WU)
/ Western European Union (WEU)
[Tasks defined following the WEU's 1984 reactivation handed to the EU]

[Social, cultural tasks handed to CoE]
[Cont.]

Council of Europe (CoE)
Entente Cordiale
S: 8 April 1904
Dunkirk Treaty (Note: Although not EU treaties per se, these treaties affected the development of the EU defence arm, a main part of the CFSP. The Franco-British alliance established by the Dunkirk Treaty was de facto superseded by WU. The CFSP pillar was bolstered by some of the security structures that had been established within the remit of the 1955 Modified Brussels Treaty (MBT). The Brussels Treaty was terminated in 2011, consequently dissolving the WEU, as the mutual defence clause that the Lisbon Treaty provided for EU was considered to render the WEU superfluous. The EU thus de facto superseded the WEU.)
S: 4 March 1947
F: 8 September 1947
E: 8 September 1997
Brussels Treaty
S: 17 March 1948
F: 25 August 1948
T: 30 June 2011
London and Washington treaties
S: 5 May/4 April 1949
F: 3 August/24 August 1949
Paris treaties: ECSC and EDC (Note: Plans to establish a European Political Community (EPC) were shelved following the French failure to ratify the Treaty establishing the European Defence Community (EDC). The EPC would have combined the ECSC and the EDC.)
S: 18 April 1951/27 May 1952
F: 23 July 1952/?
E: 23 July 2002/—
Protocol Modifying and
Completing the Brussels Treaty
S: 23 October 1954
F: 6 May 1955
Rome treaties: EEC and EAEC
S: 25 March 1957
F: 1 January 1958
WEU-CoE agreement
S: 21 October 1959
F: 1 January 1960
Brussels (Merger) Treaty (Note: The European Communities obtained common institutions and a shared legal personality (i.e. ability to e.g. sign treaties in their own right).)
S: 8 April 1965
F: 1 July 1967
Davignon report
S: 27 October 1970
European Council conclusions
S: 2 December 1975
Single European Act (SEA)
S: 17/28 February 1986
F: 1 July 1987
Schengen Agreement and Convention
S: 14 June 1985/19 June 1990
F: 26 March 1995
Maastricht Treaty (Note: The treaties of Maastricht and Rome form the EU's legal basis, and are also referred to as the Treaty on European Union (TEU) and the Treaty on the Functioning of the European Union (TFEU), respectively. They are amended by secondary treaties.) (Note: Between the EU's founding in 1993 and consolidation in 2009, the union consisted of three pillars, the first of which were the European Communities. The other two pillars consisted of additional areas of cooperation that had been added to the EU's remit.)
S: 7 February 1992
F: 1 November 1993
Amsterdam Treaty
S: 2 October 1997
F: 1 May 1999
Nice Treaty
S: 26 February 2001
F: 1 February 2003
Lisbon Treaty (Note: The consolidation meant that the EU inherited the European Communities' legal personality and that the pillar system was abolished, resulting in the EU framework as such covering all policy areas. Executive/legislative power in each area was instead determined by a distribution of competencies between EU institutions and member states. This distribution, as well as treaty provisions for policy areas in which unanimity is required and qualified majority voting is possible, reflects the depth of EU integration as well as the EU's partly supranational and partly intergovernmental nature.)
S: 13 December 2007
F: 1 December 2009

== See also ==
- 1986 Danish Single European Act referendum
- Tenth Amendment of the Constitution of Ireland
- Crotty v An Taoiseach
