= Assembly of the Western European Union =

Organization

Meeting place
- 43 Avenue du Président Wilson; Paris, France

Website
- Official website

The Assembly of the Western European Union, also called the European Security and Defence Assembly, was a parliamentary assembly for delegations from the national parliaments of the member countries of the Western European Union (WEU), a security and defence organisation. Its final session was on 10 May 2011.

== History ==
Located in Paris, the Assembly was founded in 1954 when the 1948 Brussels Treaty on European security and defence cooperation was modified to establish the Western European Union. It contains an unconditional mutual defence commitment on the part of member states (Article V). The article stipulates that - “If any of the High Contracting Parties should be the object of an armed attack in Europe, the other High Contracting Parties will, in accordance with the provisions of Article 51 of the Charter of the United Nations, afford the Party so attacked all the military and other aid and assistance in their power”.

The Assembly, whose first session was held on 5 July 1955, scrutinizes the full implementation of the collective defence obligation laid down in Article V of the treaty. Article IX of the modified Brussels Treaty obliges WEU member governments represented in the council to provide national parliamentarians, who sit in the Assembly, with a written annual report on their security and defence activities. As yet no such obligation exists on the part of the European Council vis-à-vis the European Parliament. Hence, the Assembly is currently acting as an interparliamentary forum for the Common Security and Defence Policy (CSDP) on the basis of parliamentary instruments for which the WEU legal framework makes provision.

Following the transfer of the WEU's operational activities to the EU, the Assembly's interparliamentary scrutiny continued to monitor and support intergovernmental cooperation in the field of security and defence, thereby increasing transparency and democratic accountability. The work of the Assembly and its recommendations, to which governments are bound to reply, ensured that cooperation between governments at the European level is mirrored by cooperation between national parliamentarians meeting at the same level. With the Lisbon Treaty expanding the EU's role and accountability, the European Parliament called for the abolition of the assembly. However it was agreed at the end of March 2010 to abolish the whole of the WEU. The assemblies functions were wound up in May 2011, although there is hope from members that work would continue in some form through provisions encouraging cooperation between the national parliaments of the European Union.

=== Achievements ===
- The Petersberg tasks, agreed by WEU Ministers in 1992, defined the scope of CSDP crisis-management activities;
- the former WEU Satellite Centre in Torrejón/Spain now provided the EU with a degree of autonomy in analysing satellite imagery for intelligence;
- the WEU Institute for Security Studies (EU) in Paris has been transferred to the EU;
- Defence Ministers participate in the council's activities;
- increasing Europeanisation of NATO;
- recognition of the need for a European chain of command;
- the handbook on European military standards and procedures, given as a reference to the EU Military Staff;
- Europe-wide cooperation on defence equipment and in particular the creation of the European Defence Agency, which has absorbed the functions of the Western European Armaments Group (WEAG) and the Western European Armaments Organisation (WEAO).

All the above achievements are the direct result of WEU's past experience and of the political input and impetus generated by national parliamentarians working together in the Assembly.

== Members ==
39 European countries, including all EU and European NATO member states, had the right to send parliamentary delegations to the Assembly. It had nearly 400 members. Many were members of the defence, foreign or European affairs committees in their own parliaments.

== Structure ==
The former EU High Representative Javier Solana, who was responsible for the CSDP (then known as the ESDP, was at the same time the WEU Secretary-General, thus creating a link between both organisations at the highest executive level. The last Assembly of WEU President was Robert Walter (UK), who took over from Jean-Pierre Masseret (France, Socialist group) in 2008. The last Secretary General / Clerk to the Assembly was Mr Colin Cameron (UK).

The main interparliamentary work within the Assembly is done by 4 committees:

- The Defence Committee is concerned with European security and defence issues from an operational and military standpoint.
- The Political Committee addresses the political aspects of European security and defence.
- The Technological and Aerospace Committee is concerned with matters pertaining to defence and to cooperation in the field of armaments.
- The Committee for Parliamentary and Public Relations is responsible for cooperation with national parliaments and monitors and analyses security and defence debates in national parliaments as well as parliamentary questions put to national governments. It also makes comparative studies and proposes improved benchmarks for government accountability.

The members of the Assembly met twice a year for plenary sessions and throughout the year in committee meetings, conferences and colloquies. Each committee appointed a Rapporteur from among its members, who presented a draft report and recommendation on current security and defence issues to the competent committee. After several debates during which the draft recommendations were often considerably modified, committee members voted on the final texts which were then submitted to the plenary session for amendment and adoption by the Assembly. Assembly Recommendations were sent to the council, which was obliged to give written replies. Parliamentarians also had the right to put questions to the council.
