= Cooperation procedure =

The cooperation procedure (formally known as the Article 252 procedure) was one of the principal legislative procedures of the European Community, before the entrance into force of the Treaty of Amsterdam. It was retained after that treaty but only in a few areas. It was finally repealed by the Treaty of Lisbon in 2009.

The procedure's introduction by the Single European Act marked the first step toward real power for the European Parliament. Under the procedure the Council could, with the support of Parliament and acting on a proposal by the Commission, adopt a legislative proposal by a qualified majority, but the Council could also overrule a rejection of a proposed law by the Parliament by adopting a proposal unanimously.

Prior to the Amsterdam Treaty the procedure covered a wide variety of legislation, notably in relation to the creation of the Single Market. It was amended by that treaty when its replacement with the codecision procedure failed to be agreed. The Nice Treaty limited the procedure to certain aspects of economic and monetary union.

The cooperation procedure was repealed by the Treaty of Lisbon.

== See also ==
- Legislature of the European Union
- Codecision procedure
