= Offshore Supplies Office =

OSO was a British government agency with a remit to support British suppliers to the offshore oil and gas industry in the British sector of the North Sea. It was set up in 1973, following the publication the previous year of a report entitled Study of Potential Benefits to British Industry from Offshore Oil and Gas Developments (the IMEG Report).

The primary aim was to raise British industrial participation in North Sea expenditure from an assumed 30% to a target 70%. The principal mechanism was the so-called 'Full and Fair Opportunity' policy aimed at ensuring British-based suppliers (whether or not locally owned) could compete on equal terms with foreign firms. OSO also promoted the establishment of new British-based suppliers, including encouraging inward investment and joint ventures between British and foreign firms. Later, it became involved in R&D support and export promotion. On the basis of its own calculations, OSO rapidly reached and then substantially exceeded its 70% UK content target. However, its statistics were the subject of considerable criticism.

By the late 1980s, the increasing maturity of the North Sea, changes in oil company procurement practices and pressure from the European Commission were all impacting negatively on OSO operations. In preparation for the introduction of the European Single Market, in 1992 OSO abandoned the 'Full and Fair Opportunity' policy and the collection of UK content statistics, leaving it to concentrate on export promotion and R&D support. First as an independent entity with a remit expanded to include the downstream oil and gas and petrochemicals sectors and later as a 'brand' within the Infrastructure and Energy Projects Directorate of the Department of Trade and Industry, OSO survived until 1999.

OSO’s flagship policy of seeking to increase the local content in the expenditure of oil and gas companies operating within a given national jurisdiction was soon widely imitated and subsequently also adopted in respect of other resource-based industries and even beyond. In some cases, governments have imposed a formal requirement for companies to achieve a specific local content percentage by value, in marked contrast to OSO’s practice of aiming at an overall non-binding industry target.
