= Treaty of Brussels =

1948 Western European defence treaty

Treaty of Economic, Social and Cultural Collaboration and Collective Self-Defence
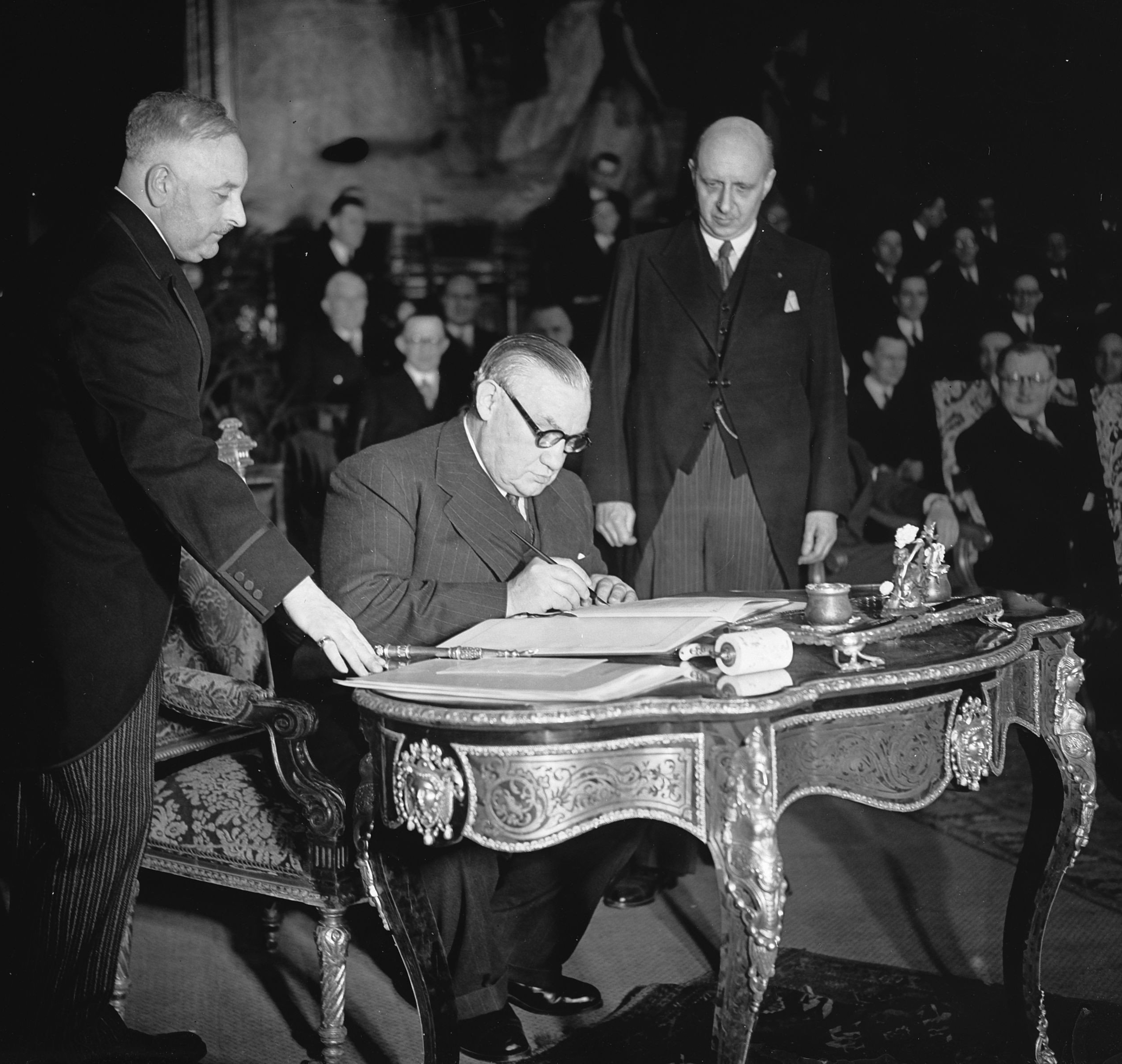
- Signing by British Foreign Secretary Ernest Bevin
- Type: Founding treaty
- Signed: 17 March 1948
- Location: Brussels, Belgium
- Effective: 25 August 1948
- Expiration: 31 March 2010
- Signatories: Belgium; France; Luxembourg; Netherlands; United Kingdom
- Depositary: Government of Belgium
- Languages: English and French

Full text
- Treaty of Brussels at Wikisource

The Treaty of Brussels, also referred to as the Brussels Pact, was the founding treaty of the Western Union (WU) between 1948 and 1954, when it was amended as the Modified Brussels Treaty (MTB) and served as the founding treaty of the Western European Union (WEU) until its termination in 2010. The treaty provided for the organisation of military, economic, social and cultural cooperation among member states as well as a mutual defence clause.

The treaty was signed on 17 March 1948 by Belgium, France, Luxembourg, the Netherlands and the United Kingdom, the members of the Western Union, as an expansion to the Treaty of Dunkirk, which had been signed between Britain and France the previous year to guard against possible German or Soviet aggression after the end of World War II.

The need to back up the commitments of the North Atlantic Treaty with appropriate political and military structures led to the creation of the North Atlantic Treaty Organization (NATO). In December 1950, the parties to the Treaty of Brussels decided to transfer the headquarters, personnel and plans of the Western Union Defence Organisation (WUDO) to NATO, whose Supreme Headquarters Allied Powers Europe (SHAPE) took over responsibility for the defence of Western Europe.

The establishment of NATO, along with the signing of a succession of treaties establishing the Organisation for European Economic Cooperation (April 1948), the Council of Europe (May 1949) and the European Coal and Steel Community (April 1951), left the Treaty of Brussels and its Western Union devoid of authority.

The treaty was amended at the 1954 Paris Conference as a result of the failure of the Treaty establishing the European Defence Community to gain French ratification: The General Treaty (German: Deutschlandvertrag) of 1952 formally named the EDC as a prerequisite of the end of Allied occupation of Germany, and there was a desire to include Germany in the Western defence architecture. The Modified Brussels Treaty (MBT) transformed the Western Union into the Western European Union (WEU), at which point Italy and Germany were admitted. Although the WEU that was established by the Modified Brussels Treaty was significantly less powerful and ambitious than the original Western Union, German membership of the WEU was considered sufficient for the occupation of the country to end in accordance with the General Treaty.

When the European Union (EU) gained its own mutual defence clause upon the entry into force of the Treaty of Lisbon in 2009, the members of the WEU, which were also EU member states, regarded the WEU as redundant. Consequently, the Modified Treaty of Brussels was terminated on 31 March 2010, followed by the closure of WEU bodies on 30 June 2011.

== Contents ==
The treaty provided for the organisation of military, economic, social and cultural cooperation among member states.

The Treaty of Brussels contained a mutual defence clause (Article IV in the original treaty and Article V in the Modified Brussels Treaty).

== History ==
=== Background ===
==== Timeline ====
- 22 January 1948: British foreign minister Ernest Bevin announces that the United Kingdom will propose, in agreement with their French colleagues, the drafting of a treaty that expands the 1947 Treaty of Dunkirk to also include the Benelux countries.
- 31 January 1948: Benelux foreign ministers declare that their countries agree to begin these talks.
- 19 February 1948: France and the United Kingdom submit a draft treaty to the Benelux states.
- 4 March 1948: A conference is held in Brussels between the five foreign ministers, from which point the proposal is elaborated, and on 12 March transmitted to the respective governments.

==== Motivation ====
The treaty was intended to provide Western Europe with a bulwark against the communist threat and to bring greater collective security. There were cultural and social clauses and concepts for the setting up of a 'Consultative Council'. Co-operation between Western nations was believed to help stop the spread of Communism.

=== Signing ===
The Treaty was signed on 17 March 1948 by the following plenipotentiaries:

- Prince Charles of Belgium, as the reigning prince regent of Belgium
- Vincent Auriol, President of France
- Charlotte, Grand Duchess of Luxembourg
- Queen Wilhelmina of the Netherlands
- King George VI of the United Kingdom
- Paul-Henri Spaak, Prime Minister of Belgium
- Georges Bidault, French Minister of Foreign Affairs
- Joseph Bech, Luxembourgish Minister of Foreign Affairs
- Gaston Eyskens, Belgian Minister of Finance
- Carel Godfried Willem Hendrik baron van Boetzelaer van Oosterhout, Dutch Minister of Foreign Affairs
- Ernest Bevin, Secretary of State for Foreign Affairs of the United Kingdom
- Jean de Hautecloque, Ambassador Extraordinary and Plenipotentiary of the French Republic in Brussels
- Robert Als, Envoy Extraordinary and Minister Plenipotentiary of Luxembourg in Brussels
- Baron Binnert Philip van Harinxma thoe Slooten, Ambassador Extraordinary and Plenipotentiary of the Netherlands in Brussels
- George William Rendel, Ambassador Extraordinary and Plenipotentiary of His Britannic Majesty in Brussels

=== Ratification and entry into force ===
Dates of deposit of the instruments of ratification of the treaty:

- Belgium: 3 April 1948
- United Kingdom: 2 June 1948
- Luxembourg: 10 June 1948
- Netherlands: 20 July 1948
- France: 25 August 1948, at which point the treaty entered into force

=== Implementation ===
In September 1948, the parties to the Treaty of Brussels decided to create a military agency under the name of the Western Union Defence Organization. It consisted of a WU Defence Committee at Prime Ministerial level, and a WU Combined Chiefs of Staff committee, including all the national chiefs of staff, which would direct the operative organisation.

Field Marshal Bernard Montgomery (UK) was appointed permanent Chairman of the Land, Naval and Air Commanders-in-Committee, with headquarters in Fontainebleau, France. The nominated commanders-in-chief were General Jean de Lattre de Tassigny (France) as C-in-C, Land Forces, Air Chief Marshal Sir James Robb (UK) as C-in-C, Air Forces, and Vice-Admiral Robert Jaujard (France) for the Navy, as Flag Officer Western Europe. Volume 3 of Nigel Hamilton's Life of Montgomery of Alamein gives a good account of the disagreements between Montgomery and de Lattre which caused much ill-feeling in the headquarters.

==== Cannibalisation and marginalisation ====
The treaty was left devoid of much of its authority after the signing of a succession of treaties establishing the Organisation for European Economic Cooperation (April 1948), the North Atlantic Treaty Organization (April 1949), the Council of Europe (May 1949) and the European Coal and Steel Community (April 1951). Responding to calls from the 1948 Congress of Europe for European cooperation on a wider front, the Consultative Council convened a Committee for the Study of European Unity, which met eight times from November 1948 to January 1949, formulating proposals for a new organisation that was to become the Council of Europe.

When the division of Europe into two opposing camps became considered unavoidable, the threat of the USSR became much more important than the threat of German rearmament. Western Europe, therefore, sought a new mutual defence pact involving the United States, a powerful military force for such an alliance. The United States, concerned with containing the influence of the USSR, was responsive. The need to back up the commitments of the North Atlantic Treaty with appropriate political and military structures led to the creation of the North Atlantic Treaty Organization (NATO). In December 1950, with the appointment of General Eisenhower as the first Supreme Allied Commander Europe (SACEUR), the members of the Treaty of Brussels decided to merge the Western Union Defence Organisation (WUDO) into NATO. NATO's Supreme Headquarters Allied Powers Europe (SHAPE) took over the WUDO's defence role.

As an effort towards European postwar security co-operation, the treaty was a precursor to NATO in that it promised European mutual defence. However, it greatly differed from NATO in that it envisaged a purely-European mutual defence pact primarily against Germany. When NATO took shape the next year, on the other hand, it was recognised that Europe was being unavoidably divided into two opposing blocks (western and communist), and the USSR was a much greater threat than the possibility of a resurgent Germany, and Western European mutual defence would have to be Atlanticist and so include North America.

Trying to avoid the need for West German rearmament, a treaty aimed at establishing a European Defence Community was signed by the six ECSC members in May 1952 but failed when it was rejected by the French National Assembly in August 1954. This rejection led to the London and Paris Conferences in September and October, with the result that the Treaty of Brussels was amended by the Protocol signed in Paris on 23 October 1954, which added West Germany and Italy to the Western Union Defence Organization (WUDO). At this time, the WUDO was renamed the Western European Union, and the Treaty was renamed the Modified Brussels Treaty.

=== Modification ===
On 23 October 1954, as a result of the rejection of the Treaty establishing the European Defence Community by the French parliament and the following London and Paris Conferences, the Treaty of Brussels was amended as the Modified Brussels Treaty. This transformed the Western Union into the Western European Union and admitted West Germany and Italy. Social and cultural aspects were handed to the Council of Europe to avoid duplication of responsibilities within Europe.

=== Termination ===
In 2009, Article 42.7 of the Treaty of Lisbon effectively replaced Article V of the Modified Brussels Treaty as the mutual defence clause for EU member states who were also WEU allies. After discussions, the ten WEU member states decided to terminate the Treaty of Brussels on 31 March 2010. The activities of WEU were formally terminated in June 2011.

Since the end of World War II, most sovereign European countries have entered into treaties and thereby co-operated and harmonised policies (or pooled sovereignty) in an increasing number of areas, in the European integration project or the construction of Europe (French: la construction européenne). The following timeline outlines the legal inception of the European Union (EU)—the principal framework for this unification. The EU inherited many of its present organisations, institutions, and responsibilities from the European Communities (EC), which were founded in the 1950s in the spirit of the Schuman Declaration.

Legend:
S: signing
F: entry into force
T: termination
E: expiry
de facto supersession
Rel. w/ EC/EU framework:
de facto inside
outside

European Union (EU)
[Cont.]
European Communities (EC)
(Pillar I)

European Atomic Energy Community (EAEC or EURATOM)

[Cont.]

/ / / European Coal and Steel Community (ECSC)

(Distr. of competences)

European Economic Community (EEC)

Schengen Rules
European Community (EC)
TREVI
Justice and Home Affairs (JHA, pillar III)

/ North Atlantic Treaty Organisation (NATO)
[Cont.]
Police and Judicial Co-operation in Criminal Matters (PJCC, pillar III)

Anglo-French alliance
[Defence arm handed to NATO]
European Political Co-operation (EPC)

Common Foreign and Security Policy
(CFSP, pillar II)
Western Union (WU)
/ Western European Union (WEU)
[Tasks defined following the WEU's 1984 reactivation handed to the EU]

[Social, cultural tasks handed to CoE]
[Cont.]

Council of Europe (CoE)
Entente Cordiale
S: 8 April 1904
Dunkirk Treaty (Note: Although not EU treaties per se, these treaties affected the development of the EU defence arm, a main part of the CFSP. The Franco-British alliance established by the Dunkirk Treaty was de facto superseded by WU. The CFSP pillar was bolstered by some of the security structures that had been established within the remit of the 1955 Modified Brussels Treaty (MBT). The Brussels Treaty was terminated in 2011, consequently dissolving the WEU, as the mutual defence clause that the Lisbon Treaty provided for EU was considered to render the WEU superfluous. The EU thus de facto superseded the WEU.)
S: 4 March 1947
F: 8 September 1947
E: 8 September 1997
Brussels Treaty
S: 17 March 1948
F: 25 August 1948
T: 30 June 2011
London and Washington treaties
S: 5 May/4 April 1949
F: 3 August/24 August 1949
Paris treaties: ECSC and EDC (Note: Plans to establish a European Political Community (EPC) were shelved following the French failure to ratify the Treaty establishing the European Defence Community (EDC). The EPC would have combined the ECSC and the EDC.)
S: 18 April 1951/27 May 1952
F: 23 July 1952/?
E: 23 July 2002/—
Protocol Modifying and
Completing the Brussels Treaty
S: 23 October 1954
F: 6 May 1955
Rome treaties: EEC and EAEC
S: 25 March 1957
F: 1 January 1958
WEU-CoE agreement
S: 21 October 1959
F: 1 January 1960
Brussels (Merger) Treaty (Note: The European Communities obtained common institutions and a shared legal personality (i.e. ability to e.g. sign treaties in their own right).)
S: 8 April 1965
F: 1 July 1967
Davignon report
S: 27 October 1970
European Council conclusions
S: 2 December 1975
Single European Act (SEA)
S: 17/28 February 1986
F: 1 July 1987
Schengen Agreement and Convention
S: 14 June 1985/19 June 1990
F: 26 March 1995
Maastricht Treaty (Note: The treaties of Maastricht and Rome form the EU's legal basis, and are also referred to as the Treaty on European Union (TEU) and the Treaty on the Functioning of the European Union (TFEU), respectively. They are amended by secondary treaties.) (Note: Between the EU's founding in 1993 and consolidation in 2009, the union consisted of three pillars, the first of which were the European Communities. The other two pillars consisted of additional areas of cooperation that had been added to the EU's remit.)
S: 7 February 1992
F: 1 November 1993
Amsterdam Treaty
S: 2 October 1997
F: 1 May 1999
Nice Treaty
S: 26 February 2001
F: 1 February 2003
Lisbon Treaty (Note: The consolidation meant that the EU inherited the European Communities' legal personality and that the pillar system was abolished, resulting in the EU framework as such covering all policy areas. Executive/legislative power in each area was instead determined by a distribution of competencies between EU institutions and member states. This distribution, as well as treaty provisions for policy areas in which unanimity is required and qualified majority voting is possible, reflects the depth of EU integration as well as the EU's partly supranational and partly intergovernmental nature.)
S: 13 December 2007
F: 1 December 2009

== See also ==
- Treaty of Dunkirk
- Western Union
- London and Paris Conferences
- Western European Union
- NATO
- Treaty establishing the European Defence Community
- Common Security and Defence Policy
