= Rome Declaration =

European cooperation agreement

- Presented: 27 October 1984
- Author(s): Western European Union
- Purpose: To reactivate the WEU

The Rome Declaration was the document signed at an extraordinary session held by the Council of Ministers of the Western European Union (WEU) (composed of the Foreign and Defence Ministers) in Rome on 26 and 27 October 1984 to mark the 30th anniversary of the Modified Brussels Treaty (MTB). The declaration decided to make better use of WEU to increase cooperation between the member states in the field of security policy, and reactivated the WEU.

From the late 1970s onwards, efforts were made to add a security dimension to the European Communities's European Political Cooperation (EPC), which thus far had primarily dealt with economic aspects of security issues. Opposition from Denmark, Greece and Ireland to the Genscher-Colombo initiative in November 1981, whose aim was to extend the EPC's sphere of competence to security and defence questions, prompted the countries in favour to look for another framework of consultation. WEU was the favoured choice. Remaining EC countries - all WEU members - reactivate the WEU by means of the Rome Declaration. Following the European Communities' 1986 Single European Act, which codified the EPC in EU law contained little of substance on EC defence integration, the WEU member states adopted the Platform on European Security Interests, which emphasised the need for intra-European defence integration and strengthening of NATO's European pillar.

We recall our commitment to build a European union in accordance with the Single European Act, which we all signed as members of the [European Communities]. We are convinced that the construction of an integrated Europe will remain incomplete as long as it does not include security and defence.

— Platform on European Security Interests, Western European Union (The Hague, 27 October 1987)

== See also ==
- Treaty of Brussels
- Western European Union
