= Statute of the Council of Europe =

1949 multilateral treaty

- Type: Multilateral treaty
- Signed: 5 May 1949
- Location: London, England, United Kingdom
- Original signatories: Belgium, Denmark, France, Ireland, Italy, Luxembourg, Netherlands, Norway, Sweden, United Kingdom
- Ratifiers: 46 states

The Statute of the Council of Europe (also known as the Treaty of London (1949)), signed on 5 May 1949, brought into existence the Council of Europe, an international organisation open to all European states devoted to "the pursuit of peace based on justice and international co-operation". The Statute sets out the guiding principles of the organisation - to uphold human rights, democracy and the rule of law - as well as the mandates and functioning of its two statutory bodies, the Committee of Ministers and the Parliamentary Assembly.

The original signatories in 1949 were Belgium, Denmark, France, Ireland, Italy, Luxembourg, the Netherlands, Norway, Sweden and the United Kingdom, though the Statute has now been signed and ratified by 46 European states. Only Belarus and the Vatican City (the Holy See) are not members, while Russia was expelled from the Council of Europe on 16 March 2022 after 26 years of membership - the only country ever to be expelled in the history of the Organisation - because of its aggression against Ukraine and invasion of a fellow member state, regarded as an extreme violation of the Statute.

The treaty was registered with the United Nations on 11 April 1951 with Treaty Number I:1168, vol.87, page 103.

== See also ==
- List of Council of Europe treaties
- List of treaties
- Hague Congress (1948)
- Treaties of London
