= Western Union Defence Organisation =

Former intergovernmental military agency

- Badge
- Active: 28 September 1948
- Disbanded: 20 December 1951
- Countries: Belgium; France; Luxembourg; Netherlands; United Kingdom
- Branch: Navy (UNIMER); Army (UNITER); Air force (UNIAIR)
- Type: Multinational military organisation
- Size: c. 100 officers and 300 other personnel
- Part of: Western Union
- Garrison/HQ: Fontainebleau, France
- Engagements: Cold War

Commanders
- CinC Comm. Chairman: FM Montgomery
- CinCLand: Gen. Lattre
- CinCAir: ACM Robb
- FOWE: Vice-Adm. Jaujard

Insignia
- Western Union standard

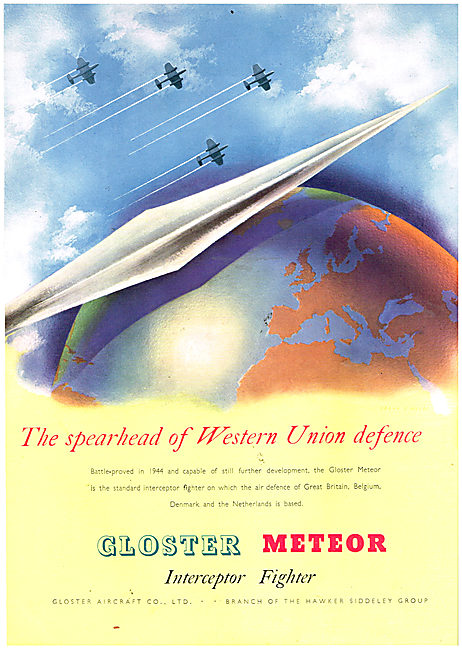
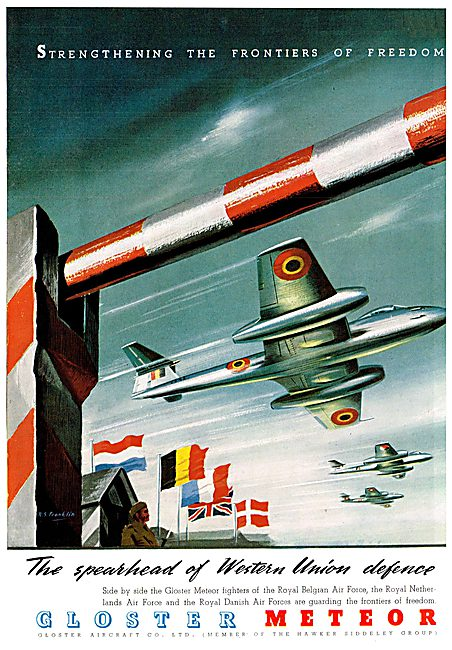
1949 and 1950 posters advertising the Gloster Meteor jet fighter as the spearhead of Western Union defence

From April 1948, the member states of the Western Union (WU), decided to create a military agency under the name of the Western Union Defence Organisation (WUDO). WUDO was formally established on September 27–28, 1948.

== Objective ==
The objective of WUDO was to provide for the coordination of defence between the five powers in the military and supply fields and for the study of the tactical problems of the defence of Western Europe; in addition, to provide a framework on which, in the event of any emergency, a command organization could be built up.

The Treaty of Brussels contained a mutual defence clause as set forth in Article IV:

If any of the High Contracting Parties should be the object of an armed attack in Europe, the other High Contracting Parties will, in accordance with the provisions of Article 51 of the Charter of the United Nations, afford the Party so attacked all the military and other aid and assistance in their power.

Article V set forth the obligations of Brussels Pact members to cooperate with the United Nations Security Council to maintain international peace and security, and Article VI set forth the obligations of Brussels Pact members to not enter any third-party treaties that conflicted with the Treaty of Brussels.

The overall command structure was patterned after the wartime Supreme Headquarters Allied Expeditionary Force, which included a joint planning staff.

== Structure ==
WUDO's organisational chart as of November 1948, in which solid and dashed lines indicate control and liaison lines, respectively:

Consultative Council (foreign or prime ministers)
Permanent Commission (4 ambassadors in London plus Foreign Office representative)	Defence Committee (defence ministers)
Military Supply Board
Chiefs of Staff Committee (WUCOS)
Finance Committee
UN General Assembly Special Committee	Security Committee	Military Committee and Combined Staff of WUCOS	Commanders-in-Chief Committee and its Chairman
C-in-C Western Europe Land Forces	C-in-C Western Europe (Tactical) Air Force	Flag Officer Western Europe

:

Fixed locations of WUDO:
London: Defence Committee, Military Supply Board, Chiefs-of-Staff Committee
Fontainebleau: Commanders-in-Chief Committee

=== Defence Committee ===
Direction and control was provided by the Western Union Defence Committee which, in peacetime, was composed of the national defence ministers. The Defence Committee was served by the Chiefs-of-Staff Committee and the Military Supply Board, meeting regularly in London. These bodies were analogous to the U.K.'s Chiefs of Staff Committee and Joint War Production Staff, respectively.

==== Secretariat ====
The secretariat worked for the other bodies, and had a British Secretary General.

=== Military Supply Board ===
In parallel with this Chiefs-of-Staff organisation, the Western Union Military Supply Board advised the Defence Committee on all questions affecting military supplies and made recommendations as to how the requirements of the Five Powers for Military Supplies could be met. The Supply Board was on a high level and was composed of one representative from each country. The British representative, who was to be chairman for the first year, was also Chairman of the British Joint War Production Staff. The infrequent meetings of the Board were served by a permanent Executive Committee working in London, composed of representatives from each country.

=== Chiefs-of-Staff Committee ===
The Western Union Chiefs of Staff Committee (WUCOS), based in London, United Kingdom, consisted of the five national chiefs of staff.

WUCOS directed the operative organisation and advised the Defence Committee on all matters affecting the defence of Western Europe, taking account of commitments in other parts of the world. Within this broad direction, its special tasks in Western Europe were those such as:

- ensuring that the military resources of the five countries were organized to meet the strategic requirements of the Allies
- ensuring the forces of the various nations were welded into an effective fighting machine
- ensuring their combined resources were allotted in the best way
- maintaining a proper balance between the conflicting requirements of internal security and home defence on the one hand, and the European battle on the other
- evaluation, preparation and distribution of the necessary resources, in particular to the Commander of the European battle, whose special task was to make the necessary operational plans and put them into operation
- keeping constantly under review definition of the exact area of the responsibility of the command of the European battle in war

WUCOS included observers from the United States and Canada. This American liaison mission was initially led by Major General Lyman L. Lemnitzer, U.S. Army, and subsequently by Major General A. Franklin Kibler, U.S. Army.

=== Commanders-in-Chief Committee ===
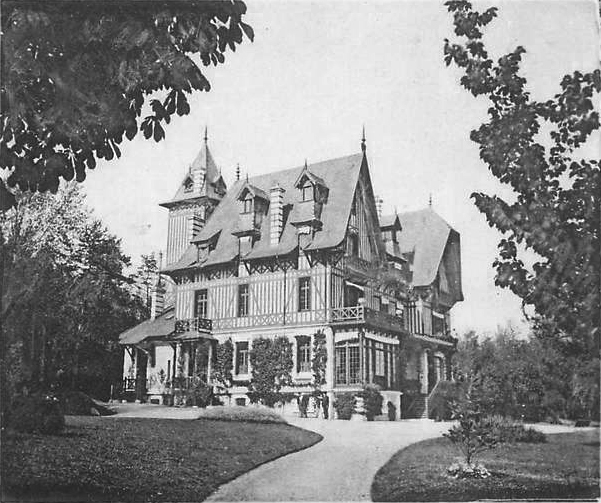
The high-level headquarters of Chairman Montgomery of the C-in-C Committee was situated in Château des Fougères (48°25′17″N 2°43′58″E, demolished in 1998) in Fontainebleau's neighbouring commune Avon.

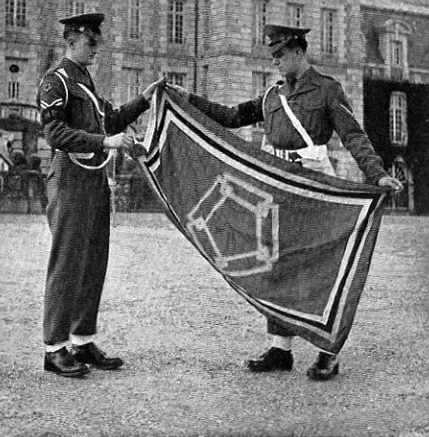
NCOs of the Corps of the Royal Military Police displaying the Western Union Standard on 1 October 1949, outside Château de Courances, which served as private residence for Chairman Montgomery.

The Western Union Commanders-in-Chief Committee, responsible to the Western Union Chiefs-of-Staff Committee, was created on 5 October 1948.

The committee consisted of Western Union Commanders-in-Chief for the three military branches (Land, Naval and Air), as well as the senior officer, designated Chairman. Their immediate task was to study the tactical problems of the defence of Western Europe, i.e. make plans to meet a Soviet armed threat in Western Europe. They did not assume executive command of any forces in peacetime, although they were in close contact with Military Governors of the occupation zones, and it was hoped that, to a limited extent, peacetime dispositions could be adjusted to meet the needs of defence.

Members of the Western Union Commanders-in-Chief Committee
Portrait	Name	Title	Defence branch	Nationality
	Field Marshal Bernard Montgomery	Chairman (Chief UNIFORCE, in time of emergency Supreme Commander UNIFORCE)	British Army	United Kingdom
	General Jean de Lattre de Tassigny	Commander-in-chief, Land Forces, Western Europe (CinCLand), Commander-in-Chief UNITER	French Army	France
	Air Chief Marshal Sir James Robb	Commander-in-chief, Air Forces, Western Europe (CinCAir), Commander-in-Chief UNIMER	Royal Air Force	United Kingdom
	Vice-Admiral Robert Jaujard	Flag Officer, Western Europe (FOWE), Commander-in-Chief UNIAIR	French Navy	France

Château de Courances served as private residence for Chairman Montgomery.

=== Combined Allied Command ===
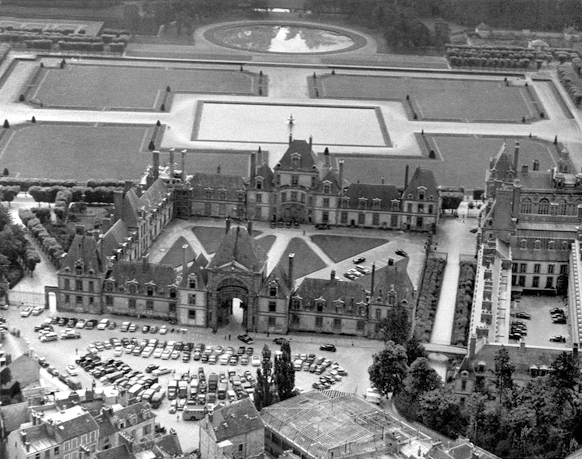
The Henry IV quarter at the Palace of Fontainebleau
(48°24′10″N 2°42′8″E) housed the air, sea and land commands
of the Combined Allied Command (UNIFORCE). Prior to World War II these
offices housed the Artillery School.

The committee formed a nucleus command organisation in the French town of Fontainebleau, south of Paris, known as the Combined Allied Command of WUDO (UNILION), which, in war, would be capable of commanding all forces (UNIFORCE) to meet a Soviet armed threat. UNILION employed c. 100 officers and 300 other personnel.

The top-level headquarters of UNILION, with the office of the C-in-C Committee Chairman, was housed in Château des Fougères in Fontainebleau's neighbouring commune of Avon.

UNILION's three subordinate commands, one for each service, were housed in the Henri IV quarter at the Palace of Fontainebleau:

- Sea Command (UNIMER)
- Air Command (UNIAIR)
- Land Command (UNITER)

Much ill-feeling was caused in the headquarters from disagreements between Chairman Montgomery and CinCLand de Lattre. Volume 3 of Nigel Hamilton's Life of Montgomery of Alamein gives a good account of these disagreements.

== Military exercises ==
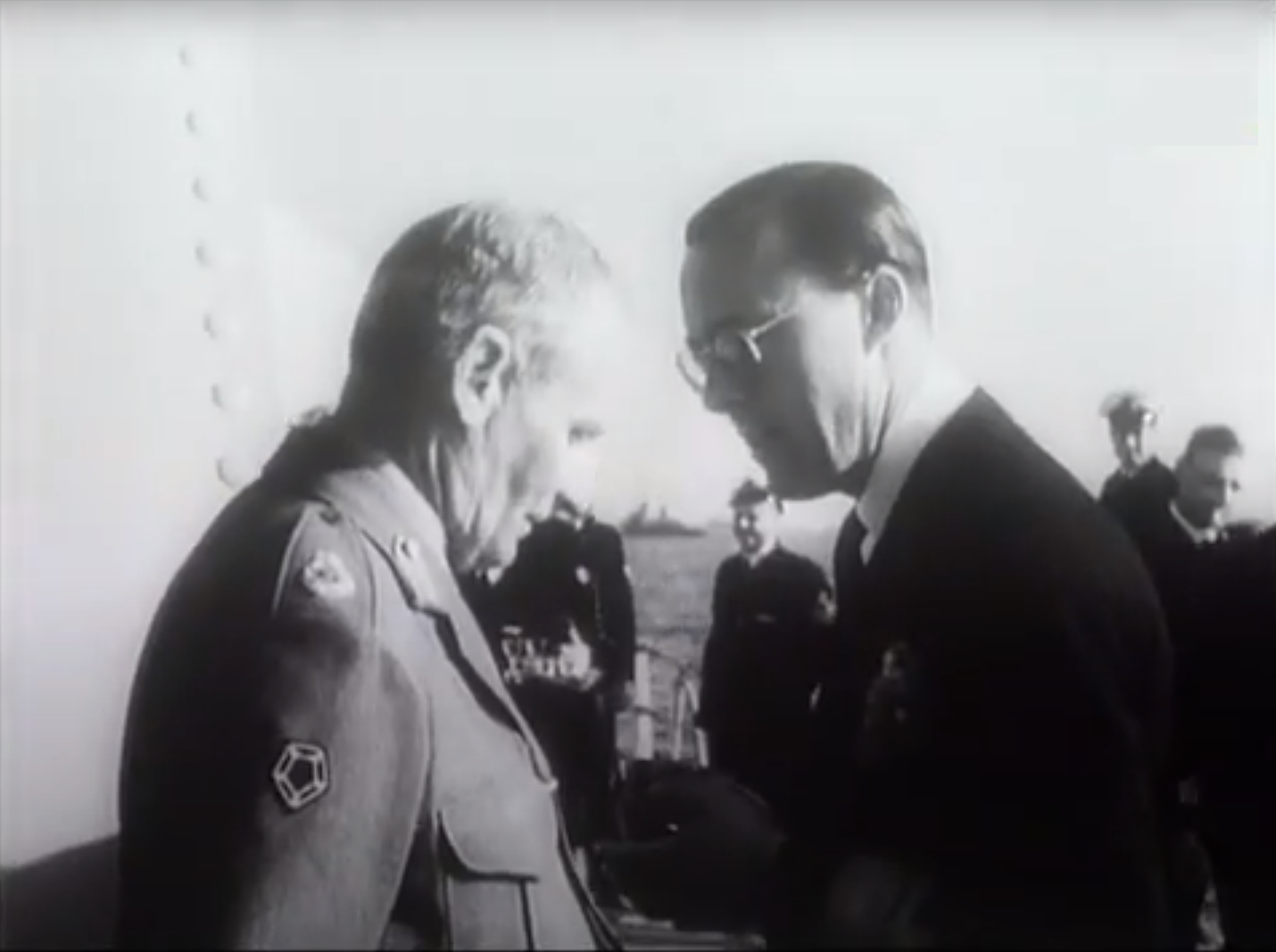
Chairman Bernard Montgomery of the C-in-C Committee wearing the WU shoulder badge when meeting Dutch Prince Bernhard aboard HNLMS Tromp in July 1949 during Exercise Verity.

The Western Union mounted the following training exercises (incomplete list):

Date	Name	Service Branch	Description
September 1949	Operation Bulldog	Air	Exercise in the last week of September of air forces of UK (also Royal Auxiliary AF, France, Belgium and Netherlands based in Exeter, SW England. The US Third Air Division pretended to be the enemy and flew a mock raid with B50 and B29 bombers against Oxford, which was successfully repelled by the British with their modern jet fighter aircraft. It was decided that more jet fighters would be desirable as well as jet powered bombers.
July 1949	Exercise Verity	Naval	Involving 60 warships from the British, French, and Dutch navies held in the Bay of Biscay during July 1949. The exercise was under the overall command of Admiral of the Fleet Sir Rhoderick McGrigor, RN, the Commander-in-Chief, Home Fleet. The 60-ship flotilla included the British battleship Anson; the British carriers Implacable, Victorious and Theseus; and the French carrier Arromanches. Admiral McGrigor summarized the accomplishments of Exercise Verity by noting: "The object of these manoeuvres is to show that we are willing and able to work together in case of aggression. I can say straight away that it's been a very great success."
Fall 1949	?	Ground	Following Exercise Verity, WUDO announced that a major ground military exercise was scheduled for Fall 1949 under overall command of Général d'Armée Jean de Lattre de Tassigny.
August 25-27, 1950	Exercise Cupola	Air	First WUDO exercise on the continent, including fifty squadrons, almost half from the RAF. Mock attacks from the east by US bombers such as Superfortresses against main industrial and communication centres in France, Belgium and the Netherlands. The first large scale test of RAF Fighter Command and British radar as adopted by the member nations.
?	Operation Gladio	General	Operation Gladio was a clandestine "stay-behind" operation preparing for, and implementing, armed resistance in the event of a Warsaw Pact invasion and conquest.
