= Council Working Party =

Preparatory body of the Council of the European Union

A Council working party or working party is a preparatory body of the Council of the European Union. The more than 150 working parties are tasked with the first examination of legislative proposals by the European Commission and play a role during the trilogue meetings which serve to shorten the legislative procedure of the European Union.

Working parties are made up of civil servants of the Member States, the European Commission and the General Secretariat of the Council and chaired by the Member State, which currently holds the rotating Council presidency.

Scholars argue that working parties informally make the majority of Council decisions.

== Legal basis ==
The legal basis for Council working parties is Article 19(3) of the Council's Rules of Procedure. According to this rule, "working parties may be set up by, or with the approval of, Coreper with a view to carrying out certain preparatory work or studies defined in advance". Coreper, the Committee of Permanent Representatives, thus creates or approves every Council working party.

== Function ==
=== First examination of Commission proposals ===
In the legislative procedure of the European Union, the European Commission has – with some rare exceptions – the sole right to propose new European legislation. If the European Commission proposes new legislation, this proposal (also called "dossier") is submitted to a Council working party for a first examination. The current Council presidency decides, which working party is to be tasked with the examination of the proposal.

In a Council working party, every Member State is represented by its civil servants, who come either from their ministries or their permanent representations. The members of the working party examine the commission's proposal and analyse whether the proposal is compatible with the legal system of the respective Member State and whether its policies are acceptable for their national government. For this work they receive instructions by their government. During the sessions of the working party, it is the task of the civil servants of the European Commission to explain and defend their proposal.

The examination of a Commission proposal ends, if the Council presidency – which rotates every six months between the Member States – concludes that there is enough support for the adoption of a common position of the Council on the dossier, called the general approach. However, no voting takes place in a working party.

The Council presidency then submits the position of the working party on the dossier to Coreper for a vote. In Coreper, the Member States are represented by their permanent representatives, thus at ambassadorial level. If the vote is successful, the file goes to the Council of the European Union – which is convened at ministerial level – for a further final vote on the general approach.

=== During trilogue ===
Council working parties also play a role during trilogues. Trilogues are inter-institutional negotiations in the European legislative process between the European Parliament, the Council, and the European Commission. During these negotiations a compromise between the positions of the three European institutions has to be found.

The Council presidency negotiates for the Council during the trilogue meetings. The presidency is often represented by an ambassador or the chair of the respective working party. The presidency has to report back to the Member States to update them on the progress of the negotiations. This is often done by informing the Council working party orally and sharing an updated "four-column document", a document which has the Commission proposal in its first, the European Parliament's position in its second, the Council's general approach in its third and finally the current compromise position in its fourth column. During the working party sessions, the Members States can give feedback and guidance to the presidency on their opinions concerning the various compromise positions. This is of high importance because the compromise position adopted during trilogue needs, inter alia, to be formally approved by Coreper and the Council (at ministerial level), so enough support for it is essential.

== Number of Council working parties and meeting schedule ==
The General Secretariat of the Council is tasked with providing a public list of the preparatory bodies of the Council (Note: The list may be accessed here: Council preparatory bodies.) and only the working parties on this list may meet as Council preparatory bodies. More than 150 working parties exist.

The meeting schedule varies to a large degree between the different working parties. Some meet every week, others only every six months.

== Importance in the Council's decision making process ==
The importance of the decision-making of working parties has been rated highly. The scholar Häge has argued that while "working parties only 'prepare' the ministers' work, [...] de facto, they make the majority of Council decisions". This position is justified by the observation that if an agreement was reached at working party level, this decision will usually simply be formally approved by Coreper and the Council without any substantive discussion. Ondřej Doležel, a temporary agent of the European Commission, has similarly concluded that "70–99 per cent of the content of legislative acts" is "sorted out by working parties".

Due to the importance of the work of the Council working parties, there has been criticism that the deliberations of working parties are non-public and thus democratic control of their work is difficult to achieve.
