= Soft law =

Legal concept of non-bonding principles

The term soft law refers to quasi-legal instruments (like recommendations or guidelines) which do not have any legally binding force, or whose binding force is somewhat weaker than the binding force of traditional law. Soft law is often contrasted with hard law. The term soft law initially emerged in the context of international law, although more recently it has been transferred to other branches of domestic law as well.

== International law ==
=== Definition ===
The definition or form of soft law depends on the legal context. In essence, a domestic soft law will look and act differently than an EU or international soft law.

In the context of international law, the term 'soft law' covers such elements as:

- Most Resolutions and Declarations of the UN General Assembly
- Elements such as statements, principles, code of practice etc.; often found as part of framework treaties;
- Action plans (for example, Agenda 21, Financial Action Task Force Recommendations);
- Other non-treaty obligations

The common thread between these different types of soft law instruments is that they lack a legally binding force and they are voluntary, and therefore do not include sanctions.

==== European Union and the Council of Europe ====
The term soft law is also often used to describe various kinds of quasi-legal policy instruments of the European Union: "recommendation", "codes of conduct", "guidelines", "communications" etc. While, in the EU, soft law can be adopted by several bodies – like the Council of the EU or agencies – the most common actor in this area is the European Commission. In the area of law of the European Union, soft law instruments are often used to aid with the implementation or interpretation of EU law, or to indicate how the European Commission intends to use its powers and perform its tasks within its area of competence. The legal basis for the adoption of soft law by the European Union is found in Art 288 of the Treaty on the Functioning of the European Union (TFEU) which describes the different EU legal acts that the Union may adopt to exercise its competences:

"To exercise the Union's competences, the institutions shall adopt regulations, directives, decisions, recommendations and opinions.

A regulation shall have general application. It shall be binding in its entirety and directly applicable in all Member States.

A directive shall be binding, as to the result to be achieved, upon each Member State to which it is addressed, but shall leave to the national authorities the choice of form and methods.

A decision shall be binding in its entirety. A decision which specifies those to whom it is addressed shall be binding only on them.

Recommendations and opinions shall have no binding force."

The Article states that while European Union regulations or directives are legally binding, the Union may also adopt recommendations and opinions which hold no binding force.

The conventions of the Council of Europe are also legally binding for those countries which choose to ratify them, but countries are not forced to ratify them. The resolutions and recommendations of the Council of Europe are also soft law. These represent the views of the Parliamentary Assembly of the Council of Europe, but are not legally binding for the 47 member states.

=== Status ===
In international law, the terminology of soft law remains relatively controversial because there are some international practitioners who do not accept its existence and for others, there is quite some confusion as to its status in the realm of law. However, for most international practitioners, development of soft law instruments is an accepted part of the compromises required when undertaking daily work within the international legal system, where states are often reluctant to sign up to too many commitments that might result in national resentment at over-committing to an international goal.

=== Utility ===
Soft law instruments are usually considered non-binding agreements which nevertheless hold much potential for morphing into "hard law" in the future. This "hardening" of soft law may happen in two different ways. One is when declarations, recommendations, etc. are the first step towards a treaty-making process, in which reference will be made to the principles already stated in the soft law instruments. Another possibility is that non-treaty agreements are intended to have a direct influence on the practice of states, and to the extent that they are successful in doing so, they may lead to the creation of customary law. Soft law is a convenient option for negotiations that might otherwise stall if legally binding commitments were sought at a time when it is not convenient for negotiating parties to make major commitments at a certain point in time for political and/or economic reasons but still wish to negotiate something in good faith in the meantime.

Soft law includes increased flexibility as a it avoids the immediate and uncompromising commitment made under treaties and it also is considered to be potentially a faster route to legal commitments than the slow pace of customary international law. In doing so, these aspirational non-commitments often capture the imagination of citizens who begin to believe in these soft law instruments as if they were legal instruments. In turn, it is felt that this ultimately impacts governments who are forced to take into account the wishes of citizens, NGOs, organizations, courts and even corporations who begin to refer to these soft law instruments so frequently and with such import that they begin to evidence legal norms.

Another useful aspect of the nature of soft law is that it often can be used to evidence opinio juris on applying or interpreting a treaty.

Soft law has been very important in the field of international environmental law where states have been reluctant to commit to many environmental initiatives when trying to balance the environment against economic and social goals. It is also important in the field of international economic law and international sustainable development law. Soft law is also important in human resource management related matters such as gender equality, diversity and other topics (health and safety for instance). In social matters, so-called 'binding' legislations often leave considerable room for discretion and interpretation, whereas sometimes, 'soft law' instruments can be imposed by powerful stakeholders on their suppliers.

== Using care with reliance ==
Soft law is attractive because it often contains aspirational goals that aim for the best of possible scenarios. However, the language in many soft law documents can be contradictory, uncoordinated with existing legal commitments and potentially duplicative of existing legal or policy processes. Another key point is that negotiating parties are not blind to the potential lying in stealth in soft law. If a negotiating party feels that soft law has a potential to turn into something binding down the track, this will negatively influence the negotiation process, and soft law instruments will be watered down and hemmed in by so many restrictions that there is little point in creating them.

Nevertheless, the reliance on soft law continues and it is unlikely that its use will fade; it is likely to continue to be relied on in amounts as it also serves as a "testing ground" for new policy ideas in a world of rapid change and future global challenges such as climate change.

== Examples ==
Roberts argues that decisions surrounding the admissibility of expert evidence in English Law are mostly governed by soft law based on advice by the Judicial College and various professional association.

== See also ==
- Legal certainty
- Recommendation (European Union)
- International human rights instruments
- Monism and dualism in international law
