= Judicial College =

The Judicial College, formerly the Judicial Studies Board (JSB), established in 1979, is the organisation responsible for training judges in county, the Crown, and higher courts in England and Wales and tribunal judges in England and Wales, Scotland and Northern Ireland. This includes the training of magistrates and the chairmen and members of tribunals. The current chairman is Lady Justice King. The name changed from Judicial Studies Board to Judicial College on 1 April 2011.

An essential element of the philosophy of the Judicial College is that the training of judges and magistrates is under judicial control and direction. A circuit judge, currently Andrew Hatton, is seconded to the Judicial College as Director of Training for Courts. Employment Judge Christa Christensen is seconded as the Director of Training for Tribunals. They are also the Joint Deans of the Faculty of the Judicial College.

Paul Roberts, a legally-trained criminologist who studies forensic science, argues that decisions surrounding the admissibility of expert evidence in English Law are mostly governed by soft law based on advice by the Judicial College and various professional associations.

== Guidelines for the Assessment of General Damages in Personal Injury Cases ==
The Judicial College produces a book called the Guidelines for the Assessment of General Damages in Personal Injury Cases, which is published by Oxford University Press. As of April 2022 there have been 16 editions of this book. All judges hearing cases involving personal injury automatically receive a copy of this book.

The book was prepared by a working group under the chairmanship of Judge Roger Cox to address the problem of deciding damages in personal injury claims, and was designed to "distil the conventional wisdom found in reported cases", but was not intended as a "different approach to the problem". It contains no references to the reported cases on which it is based. These guidelines do not form part of law but are referred to by judges when awarding damages.

A similar publication in Ireland is available free of charge on the internet. In other countries, commercial publications such as "Personal Injury Damages" in Canada perform a similar role.

== Equal Treatment Bench Book ==
The college also produces the Equal Treatment Bench Book, a guide to courtroom practices for judges facing litigants and witnesses of different races, sexes, genders, religions and so on. It is designed to help judges address diverse parties and witnesses respectfully, and to make them aware of the particular needs and concerns of some of those appearing in court. The book is updated every three years, with its most recent edition appearing in July 2024.

It is the subject of public commentary and criticism, for example in its guidance on race and the treatment of transgender people in court. For example, in its latest edition, judges are advised to respect transgender people's preferred name and pronouns for most purposes, but that this may not necessarily be best to require of witnesses alleging abuse or violence at the hands of a transgender person. In such cases, the 2024 edition says, "The court should always put witnesses in the position of giving their best evidence. As in any case (e.g., a fraud where a defendant has used multiple identities), witnesses should give evidence referring to the defendant in the way they knew that person."
