= Passerelle clause =

Clause in treaties of the European Union

A passerelle clause is a clause in treaties of the European Union that allows the alteration of a legislative procedure without a formal amendment of the treaties. Passerelle is French for 'small bridge'.

The use of a passerelle clause requires the unanimity of all member states, though those with opt-outs and those not participating in an area under enhanced cooperation may not have a vote. Unlike formal treaty revision, their use does not require national ratification. According to the European Movement International, such clauses have never been used as of 2023.

== General clauses ==
The Treaty of Lisbon provides for two general passerelle clauses that apply to all decision-making under the treaties. They are subject to the following preconditions:

- It must be approved by the European Parliament given by an absolute majority of its members (before Brexit at least 376 out of a total of 751 MEPs, currently 353 out of the 705 must vote in favour), and
- National parliaments must be notified of any intended use of a general passerelle clause. If any objects to a proposal within a 6 month period the proposal fails.

Provided the preconditions are met, the European Council acting unanimously can:

- replace unanimous voting in the Council with qualified majority voting, and
- move from a special legislative procedure to the ordinary legislative procedure.

== Specific clauses ==
There are a further six specific clauses. These apply to specific policy areas and may be easier to adopt than the general clauses as they require fewer preconditions. In four of them it is the Council rather than the European Council which may the decision to use the clause. The European Parliament has no role in four of the clauses and is limited to being consulted in the other two. A national parliamentary veto is only retained in one of them.

=== European Council acting alone ===
- Under Article 31 TEU the European Council may expand on the list of foreign policy matters in which the Council of Ministers may vote using qualified majority voting.
- Under Article 312 TFEU the European Council may adopt a decision allowing the Council of Ministers to act by a qualified majority when adopting regulations laying down the multiannual financial framework.

=== Enhanced cooperation ===
- Under Article 333 TFEU member states participating in an enhanced cooperation may vote to:
  - move to qualified majority voting, or
  - move from a special legislative procedure to the ordinary legislative

within that enhanced cooperation.

The decision is made unanimously by the participating member states within the Council of Ministers. In the event a move from a special to the ordinary legislative is proposed, the European Parliament must be consulted.

=== Council acting on the proposal of the European Commission after having consulted the European Parliament ===
- Under Article 153 TFEU the Council, acting unanimously on a proposal from the Commission, after consulting the European Parliament change decision making in certain areas affecting the right of workers from a special (unanimity with EP consultation) to the ordinary legislative procedure.
- Under Article 192 TFEU the Council, acting unanimously on a proposal from the Commission, after consulting the European Parliament change decision making in certain areas affecting the environmental matters from a special (unanimity with EP consultation) to the ordinary legislative procedure.

=== Council acting on the proposal of the European Commission after no national parliament has objected ===
- Under Article 81 TFEU the Council may adopt a decision determining those aspects of family law with cross-border implications which may be the subject of acts adopted by the ordinary legislative procedure.

== See also ==
- Treaty of Lisbon#Revision procedures
- European Union legislative procedure
- European Union Act 2011
