= Signing of the Treaty of Lisbon =

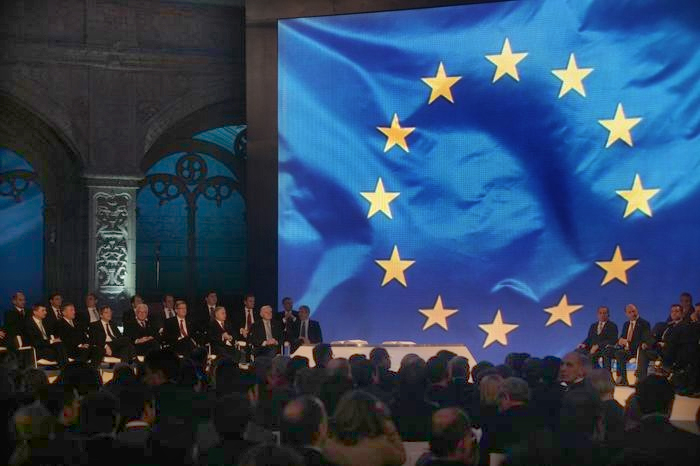
- The podium used for the signing
- Date: 13 December 2007
- Location: Lisbon, Portugal Jerónimos Monastery
- Participants: Plenipotentiaries of the 27 Member States of the European Union

The signing of the Treaty of Lisbon took place in Lisbon, Portugal, on 13 December 2007. The Government of Portugal, by virtue of holding Presidency of the Council of the European Union at the time, arranged a ceremony inside the 15th-century Jerónimos Monastery, the same place Portugal's treaty of accession to the European Union (EU) had been signed in 1985. Representatives from the 27 EU member states were present, and signed the Treaty as plenipotentiaries, marking the end of negotiations that began in 2001. In addition, for the first time an EU treaty was also signed by the presidents of the three main EU institutions. After the main ceremony, the heads of state and government took a ride on a decorated Lisbon tram together, symbolising the brotherhood of European countries on the path of European integration.

== Background ==
The diplomacy and brokering that lead to the political deal contained in the Treaty of Lisbon (then referred to as the 'Reform Treaty') was largely an achievement by the German presidency of the Council of the European Union, led by Chancellor Angela Merkel in the first half of 2007. At the meeting of the European Council on 18 and 19 October 2007, Portugal, which succeeded Germany as holder of the Presidency, did however insist that the Treaty be signed in Lisbon, the Portuguese capital. This request was granted, and the Treaty was thus to be called the Treaty of Lisbon, in line with the tradition of naming European Union treaties. The Portuguese presidency was appointed to the job of organising a programme and a ceremony for the signing of the treaty in late 2007, later specified to 13 December.

== Ceremony ==
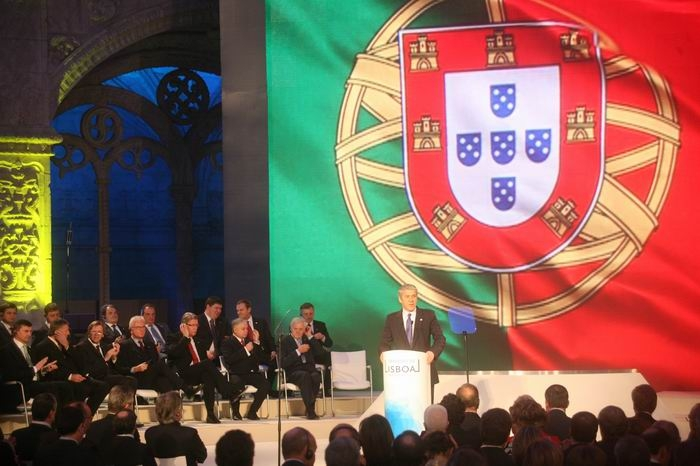
José Sócrates giving his speech prior to the signing ceremony

At 10:00 the plenipotentiaries from the 27 member states, as well as the presidents of the three main EU institutions, started arriving outside the Jerónimos Monastery with their motorcades. They were in turn met with welcome greetings by Portuguese Prime Minister José Sócrates and Foreign Minister Luis Amado. When all participants and the audience were seated inside the main courtyard of the monastery (with a temporary roof for the occasion), a choir of Portuguese children, accompanied by a piano, performed the original German-language version of the European anthem, the Ludwig van Beethoven's Ode to Joy. After this interlude, the President of the European Commission, José Manuel Barroso; the President of the European Parliament, Hans-Gert Pöttering and the Prime Minister of Portugal (in the role of President of the European Council), José Sócrates, respectively, held speeches stressing the historic significance of the day. Around noon the main signing ceremony began, with representatives from the 27 member states signing the treaty in the alphabetic order. Afterwards, renowned Portuguese folk artist Dulce Pontes performed a musical piece in the country's traditional Fado genre. The programme at Jerónimos Monastery ended with a traditional 'family photo' of the leaders outside the South Gate of the historical building.

=== List of signatories ===
Representatives from the member states signed the treaty in the following order:

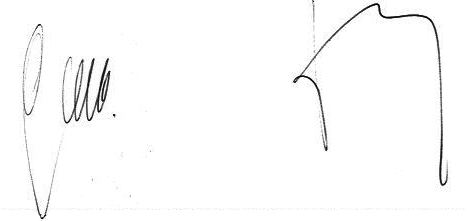
1. Belgium:
Prime minister Guy Verhofstadt
Foreign minister Karel De Gucht

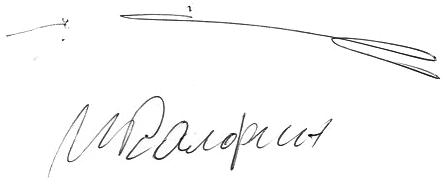
2. Bulgaria:
Prime minister Sergei Stanishev
Dept. PM, Foreign min. Ivailo Kalfin

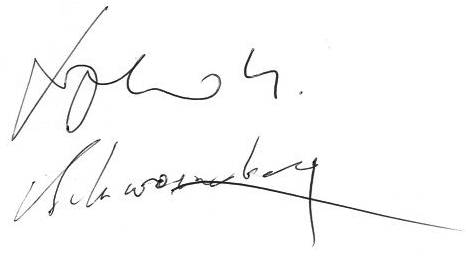
3. Czech Republic:
Mirek Topolánek
Karel Schwarzenberg

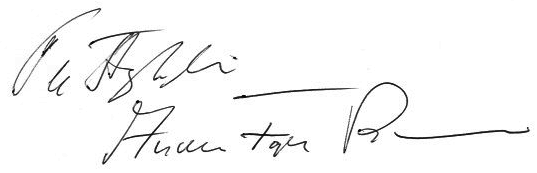
4. Denmark
Prime minister Anders Rasmussen
Foreign minister Per Stig Møller

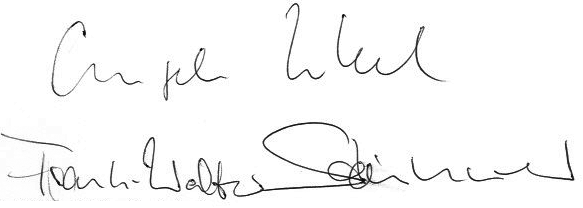
5. Germany:
Angela Merkel
Frank-Walter Steinmeier

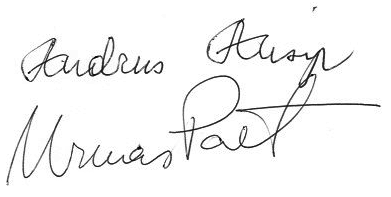
6. Estonia:
Prime minister Andrus Ansip
Foreign minister Urmas Paet

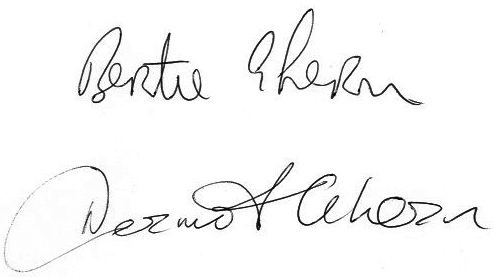
7. Ireland:
Bertie Ahern
Dermot Ahern

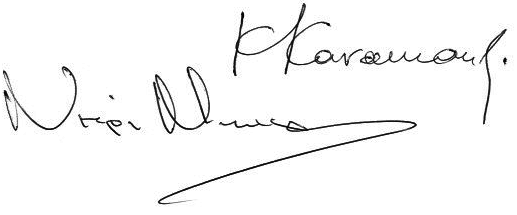
8. Greece:
Konstantinos Karamanlis
Theodora Bakoyannis

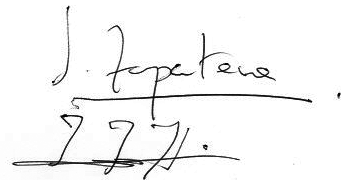
9. Spain:
José Luis Zapatero
Miguel Angel Moratinos

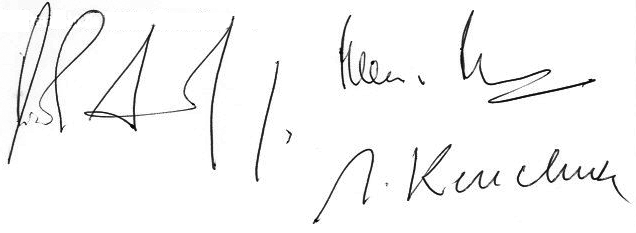
10. France:
Nicolas Sarkozy
François Fillon
Bernard Kouchner

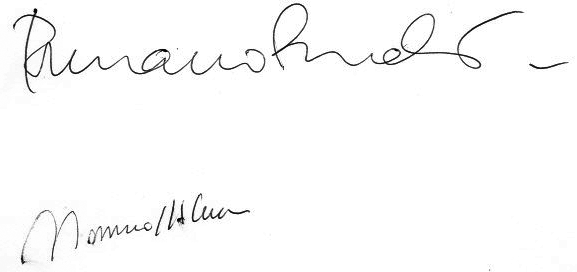
11. Italy:
Romano Prodi
Massimo D'Alema

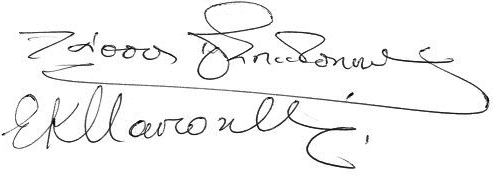
12. Cyprus:
Tassos Papadopoulos
Erato Kozakou-Marcoullis

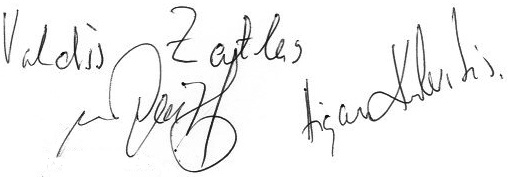
13. Latvia:
Valdis Zatlers
Aigars Kalvītis
Māris Riekstiņš

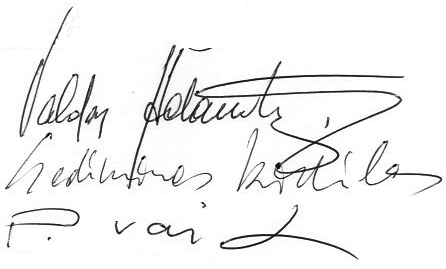
14. Lithuania:
Valdas Adamkus
Gediminas Kirkilas
Petras Vaitiekūnas

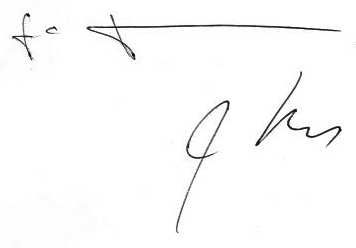
15. Luxembourg:
Jean-Claude Juncker
Jean Asselborn

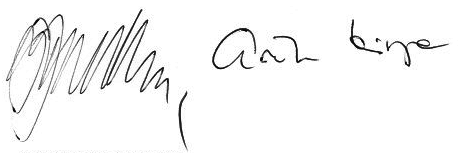
16. Hungary:
Ferenc Gyurcsány
Kinga Göncz

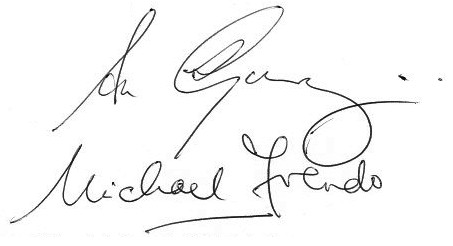
17. Malta:
Lawrence Gonzi
Michael Frendo

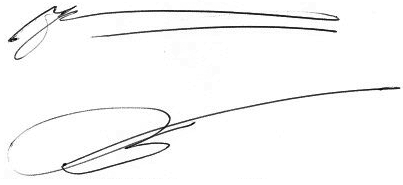
18. Netherlands:
Jan-Peter Balkenende
Maxime Verhagen

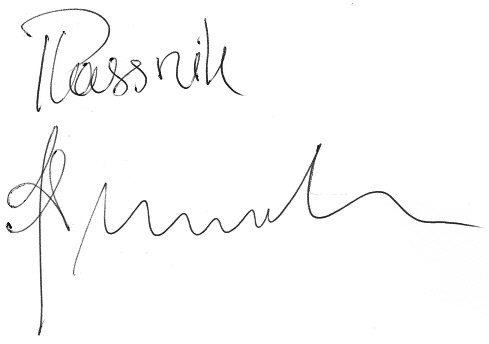
19. Austria:
Alfred Gusenbauer
Ursula Plassnik

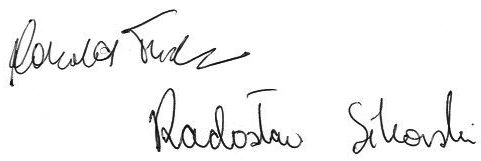
20. Poland:
Donald Tusk
Radosław Sikorski

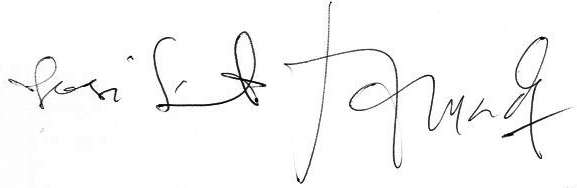
21. Portugal:
PM José Sócrates
FM Luis Amado

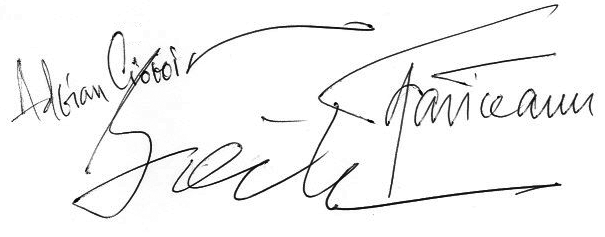
22. Romania:
Traian Băsescu
Călin-Constantin-Anton Popescu-Tăriceanu
Adrian-Mihai Cioroianu

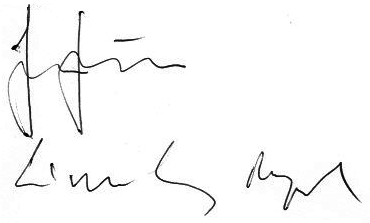
23. Slovenia:
Janez Janša
Dimitrij Rupel

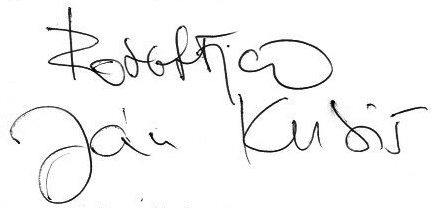
24. Slovakia:
Robert Fico
Ján Kubis

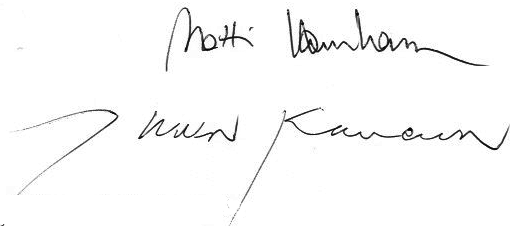
25. Finland:
Matti Vanhanen
Ilkka Kanerva

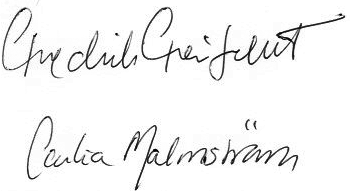
26 Sweden:
Fredrik Reinfeldt
Cecilia Malmström

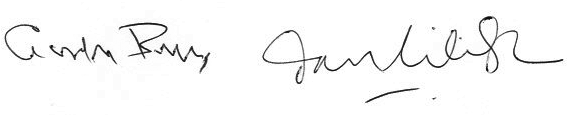
27. United Kingdom:
Gordon Brown
David Miliband

=== Location and decorations ===
The Portuguese presidency decided to arrange the main signing ceremony in the main chapel of the Manueline Monastery of Jerónimos from 1502 in the Belém district of Lisbon, partly because this location was also used to sign the Portuguese treaty of accession to the European Union in 1985.

The main ceremony was held in the 15th-century Jerónimos Monastery.

The signing itself took place on a podium with a massive LCD screen in the background, displaying the national flag of a respective member state waving when the representatives from the member state signed the Treaty.

=== Absence of Gordon Brown ===
British Prime Minister Gordon Brown was the only national representative who was planned to sign the Treaty in the ceremony but did not take part, leaving Foreign Secretary David Miliband to sign the Treaty alone. Instead, he signed the document at a lunch for heads of state and government later the same day. A requirement to appear before a committee of British MPs was cited as the reason for his absence. This brought criticism from opposition parties. The Conservatives claimed it made him appear "gutless" and referred to it as a "stunt" which proved Brown was "not very good at international diplomacy". The Liberal Democrats claimed it raised "serious questions" and Chris Huhne said showed "inept and peevish behaviour that leaves Gordon Brown's reputation for honest dealing with our EU partners hanging by a thread". Parts of British media also criticised Brown for this, suggesting he did it because he was ashamed to sign the Treaty, with Nick Robinson, BBC Political Editor, claiming that Brown was capable of attending the signing but instead chose not to.

== Tram tour and Coach Museum lunch ==
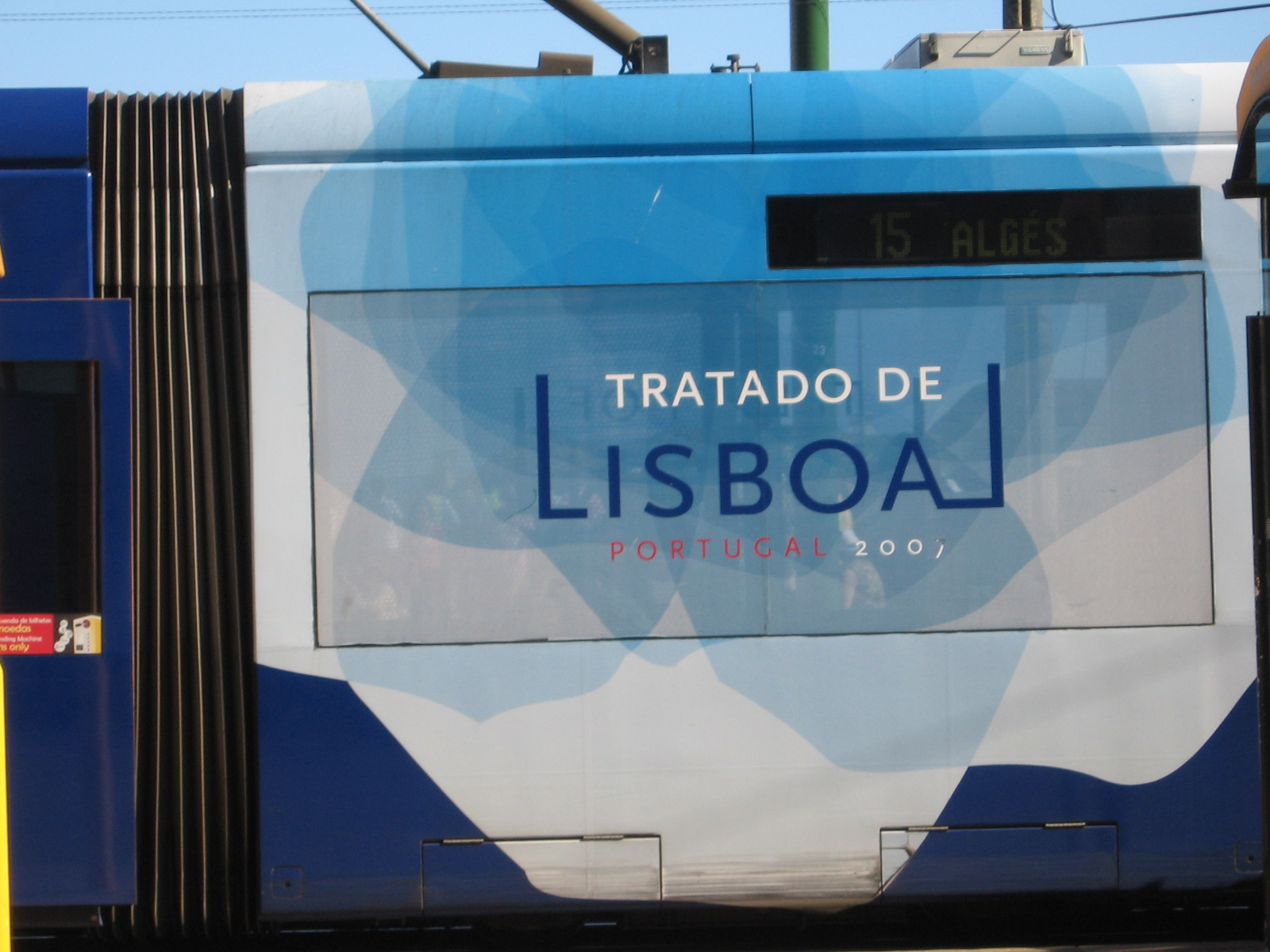
The tram that was used to transport the leaders

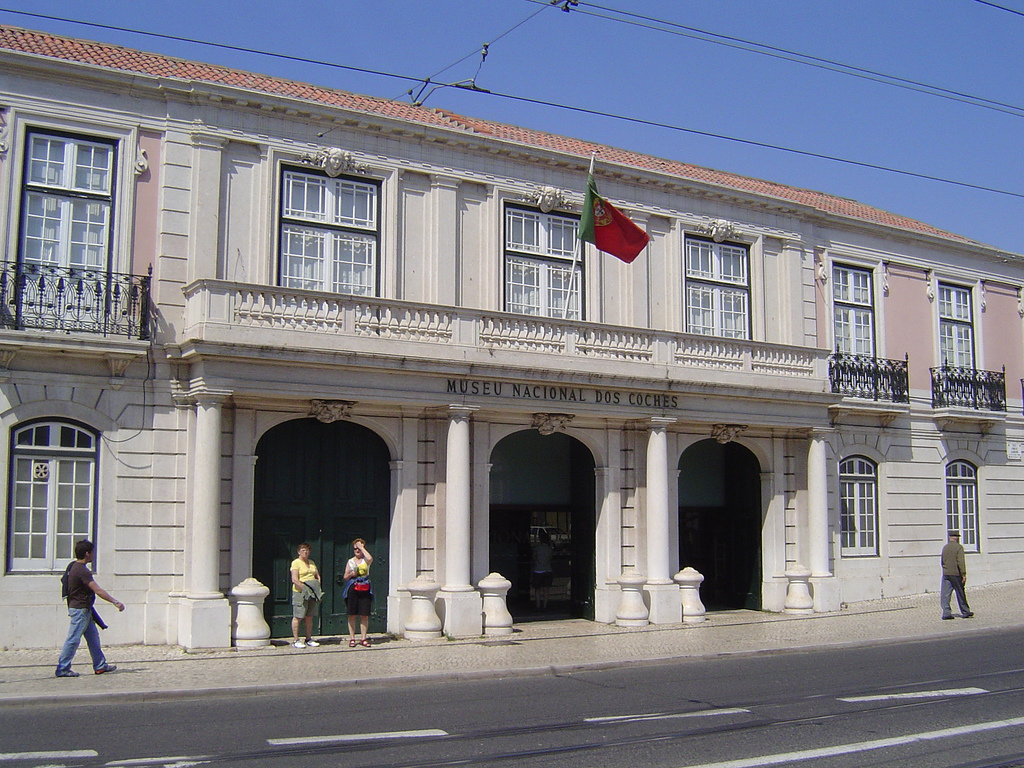
A festive lunch for heads of state and government was held at the National Coach Museum

Following the group photo outside the monastery, the leaders took a ride on one of Lisbon electric trams together. This unusual way of transporting heads of state and government was described as a symbol of the fraternity of European countries on the path of European integration. The trip ended at the National Coach Museum of Portugal, wherein a festive lunch was held amid a historical collection of royal carriages. The delay of British Prime Minister Gordon Brown resulted with him arriving at the museum and signing the Treaty there.

== Demonstrations and criticism ==
Protestors were present in Lisbon when the treaty was signed. For instance the British pressure group I Want a Referendum staged a demonstration against the treaty being ratified in the United Kingdom by means of approval only by the British Parliament, without holding an additional referendum.

The Treaty of Amsterdam established Brussels as the seat of all normal European Council meetings and as the signing coincided with one of those meetings, there was disagreement as to the venue. Belgium, keen not to set any precedent of holding mandatory meetings outside of Brussels against the treaty, wanted the meeting in Brussels whereas the Portuguese EU presidency wanted it in Lisbon in order to call the treaty, the Treaty of Lisbon.

The result was to sign the treaty in Lisbon, then continue the meeting in Brussels which became an open invitation for the media to attack the leaders for taking 27 separate unnecessary plane journeys, undermining the EU's environmental standing just as it sought to get international backing behind a post-Kyoto agreement. In the end, some leaders (such as the three Benelux leaders) plane pooled.

== Media coverage ==
The television coverage of the ceremony was produced by Rádio e Televisão de Portugal, the public broadcaster of Portugal. The ceremony was broadcast live on for instance the website of the Portuguese presidency as well as on international television news networks, including Euronews.

== See also ==
- National Coach Museum
- Ratification of the Treaty of Lisbon
