= Expert witnesses in English law =

Legal role of explaining difficult or technical topics in litigation

The role of expert witnesses in English law is to give explanations of difficult or technical topics in civil and criminal trials, to assist the fact finding process. The extent to which authorities have been allowed to testify, and on what topics, has been debated, and to this end a variety of criteria have evolved throughout English case law.

== Role ==
Generally, witnesses are not permitted when giving evidence to tender their own opinions as fact. The reason for this is that to allow opinion evidence would be to usurp the fact finding duties of either a jury - in criminal trials - or of the Judge. Thus, a witness is allowed to testify that he saw a suspect waiting on a street corner at a specified time, but not that he believed the suspect 'looked shady', or was 'up to no good'. Such evidence would not only be irrelevant as having little probative value, but could be damaging if accepted by the tribunal as fact.

The role of expert witnesses is to give certain evidence, tendered as opinion, where its basis would otherwise be outside the general expertise and knowledge of the tribunal. To this end they represent an exception to the general rule against opinion, because to follow such a strict approach otherwise would result in much scientific or technical evidence being disregarded when it was not understood.

While such a proposition may seem to make logical sense where an expert witness is simply testifying as to the consistency of ballistic evidence, or of foot prints, it is flawed when considering more subjective evidence. As the nature of an expert's testimony is inherently outside of a tribunal's understanding, the tribunal will not be well placed to consider the cogency or reliability of the expert's opinion. This has led to high profile miscarriages of justice where certain experts have expressed particularly strong opinions on matters without strong scientific consensus, or where they are considered to be the leading expert in their field. In such instances, it has been difficult for the court to initially refuse to admit experts, given their testimony is often necessary in the instant case.

== The necessity of experts ==
Fingerprint evidence given by experts has been deemed necessary and reliable.

Given the probative value which tribunals may assign to expert witness evidence, their role has been restricted to instances where their expertise is unavoidably necessary. However, as fields of scientific knowledge continue to expand, and with the advent of forensic evidence, such instances are now commonplace, and the need for experts has been described as "ever-expanding". Common areas that expert witnesses offer opinion on are ballistics, blood-alcohol calculations and levels, DNA or genetic fingerprinting, and fingerprint identification. Such areas are the least controversial, as the expert is testifying on generally accepted science, and their opinion will, in the absence of fraud, be reproducible by other experts. It is where the opinions of experts are not firmly grounded in fact that they have faced controversy.

The primary test as to whether an expert is necessary at trial is whether their expertise falls within the experience and knowledge of the Judge or jury. If it is thought that the tribunal has sufficient understanding of the principles the expert will be testifying on, then the expert is inadmissible. By way of example, two cases relating to the recollection of memories by witnesses demonstrate this rule. In the case of R v Browning, an expert was not allowed to testify on the expected ordinary deterioration of memories in healthy individuals; such a matter was seen to be firmly within the experience of ordinary individuals, and the weight of any long term memories could be accordingly assessed. On the other hand, an expert was allowed in the later case of R v H (JR) to present evidence on a complainant's recollections from a period of childhood amnesia, given that ordinary jurors would not know the complexities associated with the recollections of such individuals. Experts have also been deemed necessary to testify about the complexities of memories recalled through hypnosis, given that tribunals will not often be versed in the dangers of such memories being more susceptible to falsehoods.

=== Mental defects ===
Experts are admissible as a necessity where a defendant pleads an insanity defence, or a defence of diminished responsibility. In these circumstances it is necessary for an expert to assess whether the individual was suffering from a recognised psychiatric disease, in order for the defence to succeed. The Criminal Procedure (Insanity and Unfitness to Plead) Act 1991 requires:

written or oral evidence of two or more registered medical practitioners at least one of whom is duly approved.

Where an individual attempts to adduce expert evidence in aid of their defence, they must have been suffering from a genuine and recognised mental condition, which was capable of producing effects on the mind and body outside the expertise of the tribunal. Thus, in R v Smith, a defendant to murder by stabbing was permitted to call an expert to explain the effects of automatism, which he had been suffering from. It has been made clear that in cases where individuals are merely vulnerable or easily susceptible to suggestion, expert witnesses may not be called in order to testify to such characteristics. In R v Weightman it was stated that:

"... the principle to be learnt from the cases, notably the case of Turner, is that a psychiatrists evidence is inadmissible where its purpose is in effect to tell a jury how a person who is not suffering from mental illness is likely to react to the stresses and strains in life."

This case has been followed by R v Walker, where an individual accused of shoplifting attempted to adduce expert evidence of their condition, which it was claimed made them more vulnerable to threats of duress. While the case was described as borderline by the Court of Appeal, it was decided that such evidence could be properly admitted where it was not commonly found in ordinary individuals. A strict approach to such evidence has faced criticism in some cases, with the decision of R v Masih highlighting how a borderline case may be difficult for the courts. Here, an individual with an IQ of 72 was not permitted to adduce expert evidence of his difficulties in comprehension, social situations, and of his particular vulnerabilities. Had his IQ been three points lower at 69, he would have been seen in law as having a mental defect, and thus such evidence would have been admissible.

=== Witness credibility ===
While expert evidence may be deemed relevant when deciding the impact of any mental defect of the accused, it has generally been ruled that evidence cannot be adduced as to the credibility of witnesses. In the care proceedings of Re S (a child) (adoption: psychological evidence) it was deemed wrong that a Judge should consider evidence that the mother in the proceedings was prone to lie to authorities, based on the results of a psychological test. Another clear example is illustrated in R v Robinson, where the prosecution called an educational psychiatrist to effectively bolster the testimony of the complainant, by asserting that due to his educational difficulties he was unlikely to lie. The Court of Appeal overturned the appellant's conviction based on this evidence, with the court labeling such evidence as merely 'oath-helping'. A limited exception to the rule was established in R v Lowery. Here, two co-defendants were charged with murder, with the facts of the case such that one of them must have committed the offence. The court allowed one co-defendant to present expert evidence of the other's propensity for violence and of his lack of self-control, with the expert giving the opinion that this defendant was more likely to have committed the offence. While this case has been relied upon to some extent in the later case of R v Randall, it has been made clear in several other cases that Lowery was decided on its unique facts.

In 2006, the government consulted on whether experts could testify as to the psychological effects of rape and sexual assault on victims to dispel rape myths. Expert witnesses can testify to the psychological harms suffered by complainants in such cases, but expert evidence on the credibility of complainants in sexual offences is generally not admissible.

=== Confessions ===
Although expert witnesses are not allowed to testify as to the credibility of a witness, they have been permitted to testify as to the credibility or reliability of a confession. The test as to where this will be permissible is similar to that used for general psychiatric evidence; the individual seeking to adduce expert testimony must have been suffering from a genuine personality disorder outside the understanding of the tribunal, and this must have some effect of rendering their confession unreliable. Where such evidence is adduced, it has been made clear by R v O'Brien that the jury must be instructed they are not under obligation to accept such evidence, but must consider it with regard to the confession in issue. A second situation where evidence has been permitted is where there are allegations that a confession may have been coerced, or given as a form of compliance rather than voluntarily. In R v Blackburn the Court of Appeal ruled that the area of coerced confessions fell outside the experience of ordinary individuals, and thus expert evidence may be adduced where this is at issue.

== Reliability ==
"The better, and now more widely accepted, view is that so long as the field is sufficiently well-established to pass the ordinary tests of relevance and reliability, then no enhanced test of admissibility should be applied, but the weight of the evidence should be established by the same adversarial forensic techniques applicable elsewhere."
R v Dallagher [2002] EWCA Crim 1903

Where it is considered that an expert witness may be required to give evidence, it is still necessary to consider whether the theory or basis for their evidence is well founded, or generally accepted. If it is not, then there is a risk that a tribunal may attach undue weight to an expert's opinion which may only be his own, or that numerous experts could be called who would disagree with each other. This has been recognised by the English courts in a series of decisions, and while no general test has been explicitly stated, an approach analogous to that of the American courts has been adopted. In R v Gilfoyle the court appeared to suggest that where an expert opinion could not be independently reviewed by any given criteria, this would prevent its admittance. Shortly after in R v Dallagher this stance was expanded upon, with the case focusing on ear-print evidence. Perhaps worryingly however, in approving a passage from the American case of Daubert v Merrell Dow Pharmaceuticals, the court chose not to give regard to any of the factors for admittance that the American courts had used. These include whether a given technique can be independently tested, whether it has been published in accredited journals and peer-reviewed, and whether it is generally accepted. Without having regard to these factors, the Court of Appeal decided controversially that ear-print identifications were admissible, despite a general consensus as to their ability to identify individuals uniquely. The same principles were approved in R v Luttrell, where the Court established that in some occasions, the reliability of expert evidence would not affect its admissibility, but merely require a warning as to its shortcomings and error rate in the form of jury instructions.

It can be seen in a string of cases however that such an approach is capable of producing miscarriages of justice, given the weight which is attached to expert evidence.

== Admissibility ==
The test for admissibility of expert evidence into court is based on whether it is relevant and helpful. Decisions regarding helpfulness of evidence often depends upon the facts of the case and are made by the judge and tend to be contextual rather than based on fixed legal principles. The Court of Appeal is unlikely to interfere unless the decision constitutes so-called "Wednesbury unreasonableness".

Commentators have criticised the current standards on the grounds of the criteria for decisions being obscure and insufficiently rigorous. The Law Commission suggested a more rigorous framework after a consultation, however the Government chose not to enact the law instead updating the Consolidated Criminal Practice Directives to include a number of suggested factors for consideration. Roberts describes these directives as well as advice published by the Judicial College and to a lesser sense guidance by professional association as a form of soft law, writings that do not formally bind a court but nevertheless influence their decisions, which guide decision making surrounding expert evidence.

== See also ==
- Expert witness – Person whose opinion is accepted by the judge as an expert
- The curse of expertise – Cognitive bias of assuming others share your knowledge
