= Treaty of Lisbon =

2007 treaty amending the constitutional basis of the European Union

Treaty of Lisbon amending the Treaty on European Union and the Treaty establishing the European Community
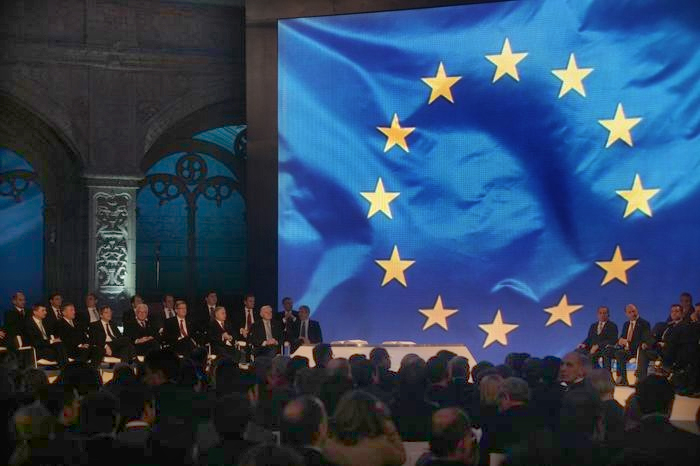
- Signing in the Hieronymites Monastery of Lisbon, Portugal
- Type: Amends existing treaties (EURATOM, TFEU and TEU)
- Signed: 13 December 2007
- Location: Lisbon, Portugal
- Sealed: 18 December 2007
- Effective: 1 December 2009
- Signatories: 27 EU member states: Austria; Belgium; Bulgaria; Cyprus; Czech Republic; Denmark; Estonia; Finland; France; Germany; Greece; Hungary; Ireland; Italy; Latvia; Lithuania; Luxembourg; Malta; Netherlands; Poland; Portugal; Romania; Slovakia; Slovenia; Spain; Sweden; United Kingdom
- Depositary: Government of Italy
- Citations: Prior amendment treaty: Nice Treaty (2001); Subsequent amendment treaty: not yet proposed
- Languages: 23 EU languages: Bulgarian; Czech; Danish; Dutch; English; Estonian; Finnish; French; German; Greek; Hungarian; Irish; Italian; Latvian; Lithuanian; Maltese; Polish; Portuguese; Romanian; Slovak; Slovene; Spanish; Swedish

Full text
- Treaty of Lisbon at Wikisource
- Consolidated version of EURATOM Consolidated version of TFEU Consolidated version of TEU Consolidated protocols, annexes and declarations

The Treaty of Lisbon (initially known as the Reform Treaty) is a European agreement that amends the two treaties which form the constitutional basis of the European Union (EU). The Treaty of Lisbon, which was signed by all EU member states on 13 December 2007, entered into force on 1 December 2009. It amends the Maastricht Treaty (1992), known in updated form as the Treaty on European Union (2007) or TEU, as well as the Treaty of Rome (1957), known in updated form as the Treaty on the Functioning of the European Union (2007) or TFEU. It also amends the attached treaty protocols as well as the Treaty establishing the European Atomic Energy Community (EURATOM).

Prominent changes included the move from unanimity to qualified majority voting in at least 45 policy areas in the Council of Ministers, a change in calculating such a majority to a new double majority, a more powerful European Parliament forming a bicameral legislature alongside the Council of Ministers under the ordinary legislative procedure, a consolidated legal personality for the EU and the creation of a long-term president of the European Council and a High Representative of the Union for Foreign Affairs and Security Policy. The Treaty also made the Union's bill of rights, the Charter of Fundamental Rights, legally binding. For the first time, the treaty gave member states the explicit legal right to leave the EU, and established a procedure by which to do so.

The stated aim of the treaty was to "complete the process started by the Treaty of Amsterdam (1997) and by the Treaty of Nice (2001) with a view to enhancing the efficiency and democratic legitimacy of the Union and to improving the coherence of its action". Opponents of the Treaty of Lisbon, such as former Danish Member of the European Parliament (MEP) Jens-Peter Bonde, argued that it would centralize the EU, and weaken democracy by "moving power away" from national electorates. Supporters argue that it brings more checks and balances into the EU system, with stronger powers for the European Parliament and a new role for national parliaments.

Negotiations to modify EU institutions began in 2001, resulting first in the proposed Treaty establishing a Constitution for Europe, which would have repealed the existing European treaties and replaced them with a "constitution". Although ratified by a majority of member states, this was abandoned after being rejected by 55% of French voters on 29 May 2005 and then by 61% of Dutch voters on 1 June 2005. After a "period of reflection", member states agreed instead to maintain the existing treaties and amend them, to bring into law a number of the reforms that had been envisaged in the abandoned constitution. An amending "reform" treaty was drawn up and signed in Lisbon in 2007. It was originally intended to have been ratified by all member states by the end of 2008. This timetable failed, primarily due to the initial rejection of the Treaty in June 2008 by the Irish electorate, a decision which was reversed in a second referendum in October 2009 after Ireland secured a number of concessions related to the treaty.

== History ==
=== Background ===
The need to review the EU's constitutional framework, particularly in light of the accession of ten new Member States in 2004, was highlighted in a declaration annexed to the Treaty of Nice in 2001. The agreements at Nice had paved the way for further enlargement of the Union by reforming voting procedures. The Laeken declaration of December 2001 committed the EU to improving democracy, transparency and efficiency, and set out the process by which a constitution aiming to achieve these goals could be created. The European Convention was established, presided over by former French President Valéry Giscard d'Estaing, and was given the task of consulting as widely as possible across Europe with the aim of producing a first draft of the Constitution. The final text of the proposed Constitution was agreed upon at the summit meeting on 18–19 June 2004 under the presidency of Ireland.

Until the Lisbon Treaty the EU did not have any explicit law respecting the foreign investment regulations.

The Constitution, having been agreed by heads of government from the 25 Member States, was signed at a ceremony in Rome on 29 October 2004. Before it could enter into force, however, it had to be ratified by each member state. Ratification took different forms in each country, depending on the traditions, constitutional arrangements, and political processes of each country. In 2005, referendums held in France and the Netherlands rejected the European Constitution. While the majority of the Member States already had ratified the European Constitution (mostly through parliamentary ratification, although Spain and Luxembourg held referendums), due to the requirement of unanimity to amend the treaties of the EU, it became clear that it could not enter into force. This led to a "period of reflection" and the political end of the proposed European Constitution.

=== New impetus ===
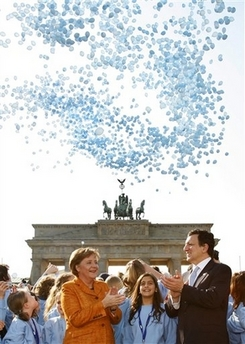
50th anniversary in the summer of 2007, Berlin (Merkel and Barroso)

In 2007, Germany took over the rotating Presidency of the Council of the European Union and declared the period of reflection over. By March, the 50th anniversary of the Treaty of Rome, the Berlin Declaration was adopted by all Member States. This declaration outlined the intention of all Member States to agree on a new treaty in time for the 2009 Parliamentary elections, that is to have a ratified treaty before mid-2009.

Already before the Berlin Declaration, the Amato Group (officially the Action Committee for European Democracy, ACED) – a group of European politicians, backed by the Barroso Commission with two representatives in the group – worked unofficially on rewriting the Treaty establishing a Constitution for Europe (EU Constitution). On 4 June 2007, the group released their text in French – cut from 63,000 words in 448 articles in the Treaty establishing a Constitution for Europe to 12,800 words in 70 articles. In the Berlin Declaration, the EU leaders unofficially set a new timeline for the new treaty:

- 21–23 June 2007: European Council meeting in Brussels, mandate for Intergovernmental Conference (IGC)
- 23 July 2007: IGC in Lisbon, text of Reform Treaty
- 7–8 September 2007: Foreign Ministers' meeting
- 18–19 October 2007: European Council in Lisbon, final agreement on Reform Treaty
- 13 December 2007: Signing in Lisbon
- 1 January 2009: Intended date of entry into force

=== Drafting ===
==== June European Council (2007) ====
On 21 June 2007, the European Council of heads of states or governments met in Brussels to agree upon the foundation of a new treaty to replace the rejected Constitution. The meeting took place under the German Presidency of the Council of the European Union, with Chancellor Angela Merkel leading the negotiations as President-in-Office of the European Council. After dealing with other issues, such as deciding on the accession of Cyprus and Malta to the Eurozone, negotiations on the Treaty took over and lasted until the morning of 23 June 2007. The hardest part of the negotiations was reported to be Poland's insistence on square root voting in the Council of Ministers.

The agreement was reached on a 16-page mandate for an Intergovernmental Conference, that proposed removing much of the constitutional terminology and many of the symbols from the old European Constitution text. In addition, it was agreed to recommend to the IGC that the provisions of the old European Constitution should be amended in certain key aspects (such as voting or foreign policy). Due to pressure from the United Kingdom and Poland, it was also decided to add a protocol to the Charter of Fundamental Rights of the European Union (clarifying that it did not extend the rights of the courts to overturn domestic law in Britain or Poland). Among the specific changes were greater ability to opt out in certain areas of legislation and that the proposed new voting system that was part of the European Constitution would not be used before 2014 (see Provisions below).

In the June meeting, the name 'Reform Treaty' also emerged, finally clarifying that the Constitutional approach was abandoned. Technically it was agreed that the Reform Treaty would amend both the Treaty on European Union (TEU) and the Treaty establishing the European Community (TEC) to include most provisions of the European Constitution, however not to combine them into one document. It was also agreed to rename the treaty establishing the European Community, which is the main functional agreement including most of the substantive provisions of European primary law, to "Treaty on the Functioning of the Union". In addition, it was agreed, that unlike the European Constitution where a charter was part of the document, there would only be a reference to the Charter of Fundamental Rights of the European Union to make that text legally binding. After the council, Poland indicated they wished to re-open some areas. During June, Poland's Prime Minister had controversially stated that Poland would have a substantially larger population were it not for World War II. Another issue was that Dutch prime minister Jan Peter Balkenende succeeded in obtaining a greater role for national parliaments in the EU decision-making process, as he declared this to be non-negotiable for Dutch agreement.

==== Intergovernmental Conference (2007) ====
Portugal had pressed and supported Germany to reach an agreement on a mandate for an Intergovernmental Conference (IGC) under their presidency. Following the June negotiations and final settlement on a 16-page framework for the new Reform Treaty, the Intergovernmental conference on actually drafting the new treaty commenced on 23 July 2007. The IGC opened following a short ceremony. The Portuguese presidency presented a 145-page document (with an extra 132 pages of 12 protocols and 51 declarations) entitled the Draft Treaty amending the Treaty on European Union and the Treaty establishing the European Community and made it available on the Council of Ministers website as a starting point for the drafting process.

In addition to government representatives and legal scholars from each member state, the European Parliament sent three representatives. These were conservative Elmar Brok, social democratic Enrique Baron and liberal Andrew Duff.

Before the opening of the IGC, the Polish government expressed a desire to renegotiate the June agreement, notably over the voting system, but relented under political pressure by most other Member States, due to a desire not to be seen as the sole trouble maker over the negotiations.

==== October European Council (2007) ====
The October European Council, led by Portugal's Prime Minister and then President-in-Office of the European Council, José Sócrates, consisted of legal experts from all Member States scrutinising the final drafts of the Treaty. During the council, it became clear that the Reform Treaty would be called the 'Treaty of Lisbon', because its signing would take place in Lisbon—Portugal being the holder of the presidency of the Council of the European Union at the time.

At the European Council meeting on 18 and 19 October 2007 in Lisbon, a few last-minute concessions were made to ensure the signing of the treaty. That included giving Poland a slightly stronger wording for the revived Ioannina Compromise, plus a nomination for an additional Advocate General at the European Court of Justice. The creation of the permanent "Polish" Advocate General was formally permitted by an increase of the number of Advocates General from 8 to 11. Despite these concessions and alterations, Giscard d'Estaing stated that the treaty included the same institutional reforms as those in the rejected Constitution, but merely without language and symbols that suggested Europe might have 'formal political status'. These 'more symbolic than substantial' concessions were designed 'to head off any threat of referenda [sic]' which had killed the Constitution.

=== Signing ===
At the meeting of the European Council in October 2007, Portugal insisted that the Treaty (then called the 'Reform Treaty') be signed in Lisbon, the Portuguese capital. This request was granted, and the Treaty was thus to be called the Treaty of Lisbon, in line with the tradition of European Union treaties. The Portuguese presidency was appointed to the job of organising the programme for a signing ceremony.

The signing of the Treaty of Lisbon took place in Lisbon, Portugal on 13 December 2007. The Government of Portugal, by virtue of holding Presidency of the Council of the European Union at the time, arranged a ceremony inside the 16th-century Jerónimos Monastery, the same place Portugal's treaty of accession to the European Union (EU) was signed in 1985. Representatives from the 27 EU member states were present, and signed the Treaty as plenipotentiaries, marking the end of treaty negotiations. In addition, for the first time an EU treaty was also signed by the presidents of the three main EU institutions.

Prime Minister Gordon Brown of the United Kingdom did not take part in the main ceremony, and instead signed the treaty separately a number of hours after the other delegates. A timetable clash - a requirement to appear before a committee of British MPs - was cited as the reason for his belated arrival.

=== Approval by the European Parliament ===
On 20 February 2008, the European Parliament voted in favour of a non-binding resolution endorsing the Lisbon Treaty by 525 votes in favour and 115 against, on the basis of an analysis of the treaty's implications by the Parliament's rapporteurs Richard Corbett and Íñigo Méndez de Vigo. They had previously been the Parliament's rapporteurs on the constitutional treaty.

=== Ratification (2009) ===
Order in which countries ratified the Treaty (when green)

All EU member states had to ratify the Treaty before it could enter into law. A national ratification was completed and registered when the instruments of ratification were lodged with the Government of Italy. The month following the deposition of the last national ratification saw the Treaty enter into force across the EU.

Under the original timetable set by the German Presidency of the Council of the European Union in the first half of 2007, the Treaty was initially scheduled to be fully ratified by the end of 2008, thus entering into force on 1 January 2009. This plan failed however, primarily due to the initial rejection of the Treaty in 2008 by the Irish electorate in a referendum, a decision which was reversed in a second referendum in October 2009. Ireland, as required by its constitution, was the only member state to hold referendums on the Treaty.

In the UK, the European Union (Amendment) Bill was debated in the House of Commons on 21 January 2008, and passed its second reading that day by a vote of 362 to 224; Prime Minister Gordon Brown was absent that day; the Bill was proposed to the Commons by David Miliband.

The Czech instrument of ratification was the last to be deposited in Rome on 13 November 2009. Therefore, the Treaty of Lisbon entered into force on 1 December 2009.

=== Impact ===
The exact impact of the treaty on the functioning of the EU left many questions open (uncertainties which have led to calls for another new treaty in response to the economic crisis in the late 2000s). When its impact is assessed, the biggest winners from Lisbon have been Parliament, with its increase in power, and the European Council. The first months under Lisbon arguably saw a shift in power and leadership from the Commission, the traditional motor of integration, to the European Council with its new full-time and longer-term President. The split between the Commission and European Council presidents involved overlap, potential rivalry and unwieldy compromises, such as both presidents attending international summits, in theory each with their own responsibilities, but inevitably with a considerable grey area. There was some expectation that the posts might be merged—as permitted under the new treaty—in 2014, when their two mandates expired.

Parliament has used its greater powers over legislation, but also for example over the appointment of the Commission to gain further privileges from President Barroso and it used its budgetary powers as a veto over how the External Action Service should be set up. It also applied its new power over international agreements to rapidly block the SWIFT data sharing deal with the US and threatened to do so over a free trade agreement with South Korea.

The Council of Ministers has, relatively, lost (or been forced to share) power due to Treaty of Lisbon. Its dynamic has also changed as member states have lost their individual right of veto in a number of areas. Consequently, they have had to come up with stronger arguments faster in order to win a vote. The presidency of the Council, which continues to rotate among member states every six months, has lost influence: the prime minister of the country in question no longer chairs the European Council, and its foreign minister no longer represents the EU externally (that is now done by the High Representative). It does not even chair the Council when it meets to discuss foreign affairs or security, when the High Representative chairs.

== Legal personality of the EU ==
Despite the acquisition by the European Union of full international legal personality upon entry of the Treaty of Lisbon into force, the EU has not achieved a truly unitary personality. One of the European Communities has remained a distinct international body, though under common management with the EU, namely:

- the European Atomic Energy Community.

Moreover, one of the EU institutions has retained partial independence at the international level, and has been considered under certain conditions a distinct international body empowered with entering treaties, namely:

- the European Central Bank.

In addition, a number of bodies created by dedicated treaties continue to exist as international entities technically in their own right, but are nevertheless considered facets of the EU, as their membership is legally restricted exclusively to EU members and subject to termination in case of withdrawal of a member state from the EU, while their constituent treaties vest various powers regarding them in the EU institutions; these bodies are:

- the European Investment Bank Group
  - the European Investment Bank
  - the European Investment Fund
  - the EIB institute
- the European University Institute
- the European Stability Mechanism
- the Unified Patent Court.

In the internal relations within EU, its legal personality is fragmented further, as each of the agencies, decentralised independent bodies, corporate bodies and joint undertakings of the European Union and the Euratom is considered a juridical person in its own right, distinct from the legal personality of EU as a whole.

== Functioning ==
As an amending treaty, the Treaty of Lisbon is not intended to be read as an autonomous text. It consists of a number of amendments to the Treaty on European Union ("Maastricht Treaty") and the Treaty establishing the European Community ("Treaty of Rome"), the latter renamed 'Treaty on the Functioning of the European Union' in the process. As amended by the Treaty of Lisbon, the Treaty on European Union provides a reference to the EU's Charter of Fundamental Rights, making that document legally binding. The Treaty on European Union, the Treaty on the Functioning of the European Union and the Charter of Fundamental Rights thus have equal legal value and combined constitute the European Union's legal basis.

A typical amendment in Treaty of Lisbon text is:

Article 7 shall be amended as follows: (a) throughout the Article, the word "assent" shall be replaced by "consent", the reference to breach "of principles mentioned in Article 6(1)" shall be replaced by a reference to breach "of the values referred to in Article 2" and the words "of this Treaty" shall be replaced by "of the Treaties";

The Commission has published a consolidated text (in each community language) which shows the previous Treaties as revised by the Treaty of Lisbon.

== Fundamental Rights Charter ==
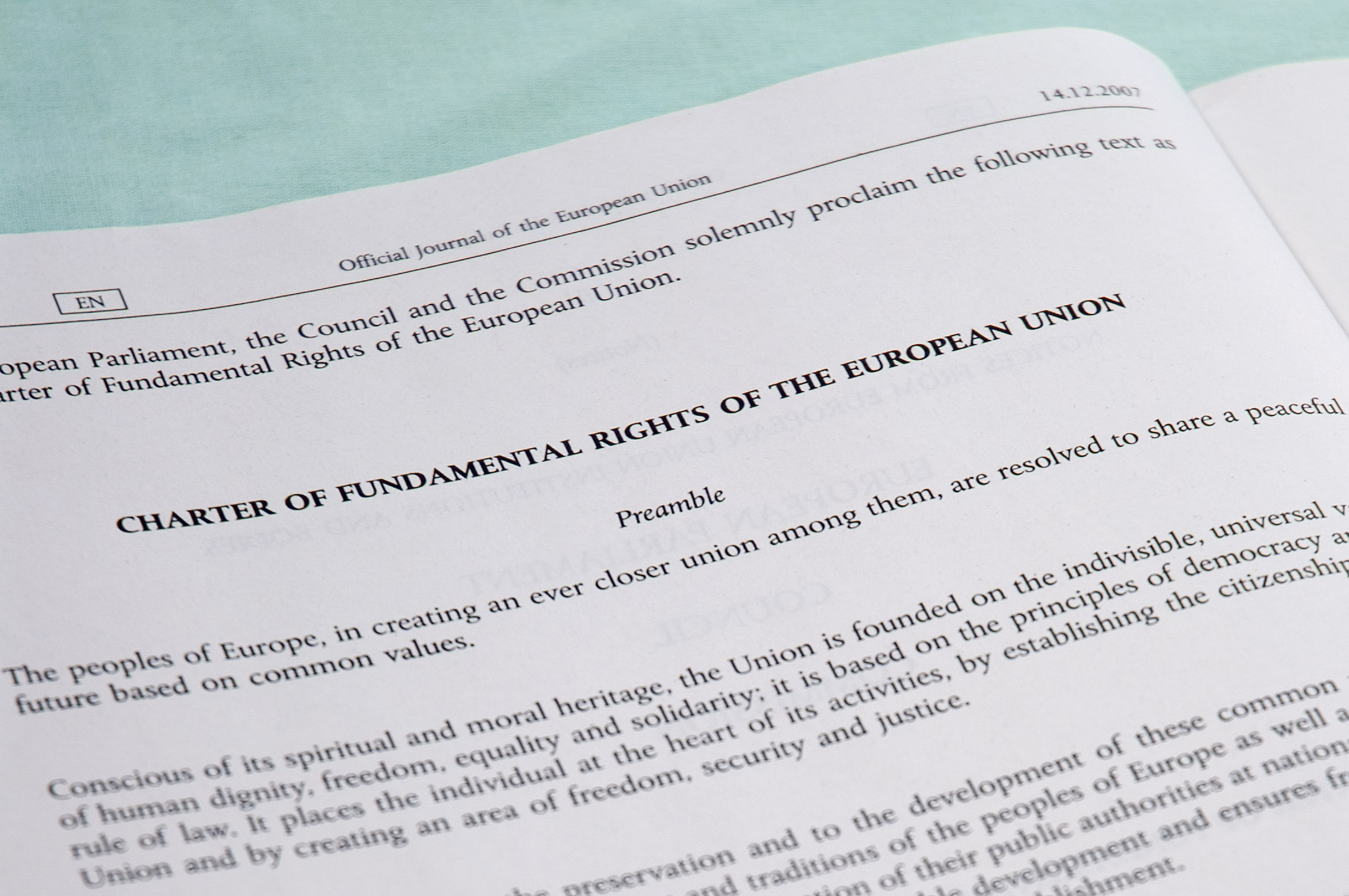
The rights charter bans, among other things, capital punishment and eugenics.

The fifty-five articles of the Charter of Fundamental Rights of the European Union enshrine certain political, social, and economic rights for both European Union citizens and residents, into EU law. It was drafted by the European Convention and solemnly proclaimed on 7 December 2000 by the European Parliament, the Council of Ministers and the European Commission. However its then legal status was uncertain and it did not have full legal effect until the entry into force of the Lisbon Treaty on 1 December 2009.

In the rejected Treaty establishing a Constitution for Europe the charter was integrated as a part of the treaty itself. In the Lisbon Treaty, however, the charter is incorporated by reference and given legal status without forming part of the treaties. The EU must act and legislate consistently with the Charter and the EU's courts will strike down EU legislation which contravenes it. The Charter only applies to EU member states as regards their implementation of EU law and does not extend the competences of the EU beyond its competences as defined in the treaties.

== Amendments ==
=== Summary ===
- A European Council President

with a full time 2½ year term,
replacing a 6-monthly rotation among its members.

- A single foreign affairs post

created by merging the External
Relations Commissioner with the
CFSP High Representative.

- Charter of Fundamental Rights

from 2000 made legally binding on the EU and in the firel of EU law.

- Pillars merged to 1 legal personality

enabling the Union per se to
be party to treaties.

- European Council separated

officially from the Council of Ministers.

- More powerful Parliament

by means of extending the codecision
procedure to more policy areas.

- A withdrawal procedure
- More majority voting in
  the Council of Ministers
- National parliaments engaged

by expanding scrutiny-time of
legislation enabling them to mandate their ministers and to
jointly compel the Commission
to review or withdraw legislation.

- Mutual solidarity obliged

if a member state is object of a
terrorist attack or the victim of a
natural or man-made disaster.

- Citizens' Initiative

to be considered by the
Commission if signed by
1 million citizens.

- Enhanced co-operation

extended to CSDP issues.

- An External Action Service
Foreseen initiatives, pending member states further implementation decision:
- Permanent Structured Cooperation in Defence
- EU Public Prosecutor
- Accession to the ECHR and the Council of Europe

=== Central Bank ===
The European Central Bank gained the official status of being an EU institution, and the European Council was given the right to appoint presidents of the European Central Bank through a qualified majority vote. On a related topic, the euro became the official currency of the Union (though not affecting opt-outs or the process of Eurozone enlargement).

=== Judiciary ===
The re-named the Court of Justice of the European Union is the judicial branch of the EU, settling disputes brought to it about the interpretation and application of EU law and disputes among the institutions or between them and member states. Its two sub courts are the General Court (re-named, previously the Court of First Instance) and the supreme Court of Justice. The previous Civil Service Tribunal was abolished, with the General Court now taking responsibility for such cases.

The jurisdiction of the courts continued to be excluded from matters of foreign policy, though new jurisdiction to review foreign policy sanction measures, as well as certain 'Area of Freedom, Security and Justice' (AFSJ) matters not concerning policing and criminal cooperation, were added.

=== Council of Ministers ===
Voting weights in both the Council of Ministers and the European Council
member state	Nice		Lisbon	
member state	votes	%	pop. in millions	%
Germany	29	8.4%	82	16.5%
France	29	8.4%	64	12.9%
United Kingdom	29	8.4%	62	12.4%
Italy	29	8.4%	60	12.0%
Spain	27	7.8%	46	9.0%
Poland	27	7.8%	38	7.6%
Romania	14	4.1%	21	4.3%
Netherlands	13	3.8%	17	3.3%
Greece	12	3.5%	11	2.2%
Portugal	12	3.5%	11	2.1%
Belgium	12	3.5%	11	2.1%
Czech Republic	12	3.5%	10	2.1%
Hungary	12	3.5%	10	2.0%
Sweden	10	2.9%	9.2	1.9%
Austria	10	2.9%	8.3	1.7%
Bulgaria	10	2.9%	7.6	1.5%
Denmark	7	2.0%	5.5	1.1%
Slovakia	7	2.0%	5.4	1.1%
Finland	7	2.0%	5.3	1.1%
Ireland	7	2.0%	4.5	0.9%
Lithuania	7	2.0%	3.3	0.7%
Latvia	4	1.2%	2.2	0.5%
Slovenia	4	1.2%	2.0	0.4%
Estonia	4	1.2%	1.3	0.3%
Cyprus	4	1.2%	0.87	0.2%
Luxembourg	4	1.2%	0.49	0.1%
Malta	3	0.9%	0.41	0.1%
total	345	100%	498	100%
required majority	255	74%	324	65%

The treaty has expanded the use of qualified majority voting (QMV) in the Council of Ministers by having it replace unanimity as the standard voting procedure in almost every policy area outside taxation and foreign policy. Moreover, taking effect in 2014, the definition of a qualified majority was changed: a qualified majority is reached when at least 55% of all member states, who together comprise at least 65% of EU citizens, vote in favour of a proposal. When the Council of Ministers is acting neither on a proposal of the Commission nor on one of the High Representative, QMV requires 72% of the member states while the population requirement remains the same. However, the "blocking minority" that corresponds to these figures must comprise at least 4 countries. Hence, the voting powers of the member states are based on their population, and are no longer dependent on a negotiable system of voting points. The reform of qualified majority voting (QMV) in the Council was one of the main issues in the negotiation of the Lisbon Treaty.

The earlier rules for QMV, set in the Treaty of Nice and applying until 2014, required a majority of countries (50% / 67%), voting weights (74%), and population (62%). Between 2014 and 2017 a transitional phase took place where the new QMV rules apply, but where the old Nice treaty voting weights could be applied when a member state formally requested it. Moreover, during that same period, a new version of the 1994 "Ioannina compromise" allowed small minorities of EU states to call for further examination of proposals before putting them to a vote.

The treaty instructs that Council deliberations on legislation (that include debate and voting) will be held in public (televised), as was already the case in the European Parliament.

The Presidency of the Council of Ministers, rotates among member states every six months, with a "Trio" formed by three consecutive Presidencies in order to provide more continuity to their conduct. However, the Foreign Affairs Council (one configuration of the Council of ministers), is no longer chaired by the representative of the member state holding the Presidency, but rather by the person holding the newly created post of High Representative.

Additionally the Euro Group sub-unit of ECOFIN Eurozone countries was formalized.

=== European Council ===
The European Council officially gains the status of an EU institution, thus being separated from the Council of ministers. It continues to be composed of the heads of state or government of the Union's member states along with the (nonvoting) President of the European Commission and its own president.

The President of the European Council is appointed for a two and a half-year term in a qualified majority vote of the European Council. A president can be reappointed once, and be removed by the same voting procedure. Unlike the post of President of the European Commission, the appointment of the President of the European Council does not have to reflect the composition of the European Parliament. The president's work involves coordinating the work of the European Council, hosting its meetings and reporting its activities to the European Parliament after each meeting. This makes the president the lynchpin of negotiations to find agreement at European Council meetings, which has become a more onerous task with successive enlargement of the EU to 28 Member States. The president also chairs informal summits of the 20 Member States which use the euro as their currency. Additionally, the president provides external representation to the Union on foreign policy and security matters when such representation is required at the level of heads of state or government (bilateral summits and G8/G20).

Under the Treaty of Lisbon, the European Council is charged with setting the strategic priorities of the Union, and in practice with handling crises. It has a key role in appointments, including the Commission, the High Representative of the Union for Foreign Affairs and Security Policy and the members of the Board of the European Central Bank; the suspension of membership rights; changing the voting systems in the treaties bridging clauses. Under the emergency brake procedure, a state may refer contentious legislation from the Council of ministers to the European Council if it is outvoted in the Council of ministers, notwithstanding that it may still be outvoted in the European Council.

=== Parliament ===
MEPs under the Lisbon Treaty
member state	2007	2009	Lisbon
Germany	99	99	96
France	78	72	74
United Kingdom	78	72	73
Italy	78	72	73
Spain	54	50	54
Poland	54	50	51
Romania	35	33	33
Netherlands	27	25	26
Belgium	24	22	22
Czech Republic	24	22	22
Greece	24	22	22
Hungary	24	22	22
Portugal	24	22	22
Sweden	19	18	20
Austria	18	17	19
Bulgaria	18	17	18
Finland	14	13	13
Denmark	14	13	13
Slovakia	14	13	13
Ireland	13	12	12
Lithuania	13	12	12
Latvia	9	8	9
Slovenia	7	7	8
Cyprus	6	6	6
Estonia	6	6	6
Luxembourg	6	6	6
Malta	5	5	6
total	785	736	751

The legislative power of the European Parliament increases, as the codecision procedure with the Council of the EU is extended to almost all areas of policy. This procedure is slightly modified and renamed ordinary legislative procedure.

Codecision will be used in new policy areas, increasing the power of the Parliament.

In the few remaining areas, called "special legislative procedures", Parliament now has either the right of consent to a Council of the EU measure, or vice versa, except in the few cases where the old Consultation procedure still applies, wherein the Council of the EU will only need to consult the European Parliament before voting on the Commission proposal. Council is then not bound by the Parliament's position but only by the obligation to consult it. Parliament would need to be consulted again if the Council of ministers deviated too far from the initial proposal.

The Commission will have to submit each proposed budget of the European Union directly to Parliament, which, jointly with the Council, must approve the budget in its entirety.

The Treaty changes the way in which MEP seats are apportioned among member states. Rather than setting out a precise number (as it was the case in every previous treaty), the Treaty of Lisbon gives the power to the Council of the EU, acting unanimously on the initiative of the Parliament and with its consent, to adopt a decision fixing the number of MEPs for each member state, with the number of MEPs to be degressively proportional to the number of citizens of each member state. A draft decision fixing the apportionment of MEPs was annexed to the treaty itself and, had Lisbon been in force at the time of 2009 European Parliament elections, but as the Lisbon treaty entered into force only after the 2009 European elections, a treaty amendment to grant extra seats to those Member States due to gain extra seats under Lisbon, but without waiting until the 2014 elections, was agreed in 2010.

The number of MEPs is limited to 750, in addition to the President of the Parliament. Additionally, the Treaty of Lisbon reduces the maximum number of MEPs from a member state from 99 to 96 (affecting Germany) and increases the minimal number from 5 to 6 (affecting Malta). When new Member States join the EU, they initially have supernumary seats until the next elections when an overall re-apportion is made (as happened when Croatia joined in 2013).

=== National parliaments ===
The Treaty of Lisbon expanded the role of Member States' parliaments in the legislative processes of the EU by giving them a prior scrutiny of legislative proposals before the Council and the Parliament can take a position. The Treaty of Lisbon provides for national parliaments "to contribute to the good functioning of the Union" through receiving draft EU legislation, seeing to it that the principle of subsidiarity is respected, taking part in the evaluation mechanisms for the implementation of the Union policies in the area of freedom, security and justice, being involved in the political monitoring of Europol and the evaluation of Eurojust's activities, being notified of applications for EU accession, taking part in the inter-parliamentary cooperation between national parliaments and with the European Parliament.

The Treaty of Lisbon allows national parliaments eight weeks to study legislative proposals made by the European Commission which gives them time to shape the position to be taken by their minister in the Council or even give him or her a mandate. They may also decide to send a reasoned opinion if they consider a propopsal to be incompatible with the principle of subsidiarity and ask for it to be reviewed. If one third (or one quarter, where the proposed EU measure concerns freedom, justice and security) of national parliaments are in favour of a review, the Commission would have to review the measure and if it decides to maintain it, must give a reasoned opinion to the Union legislator as to why it considers the measure to be compatible with subsidiarity. If half of the national parliaments take that view, then the Council (by 55 percent of the member states) or the European Parliament (by a simple majority) may immediately terminate the legislative procedure.

=== Commission ===
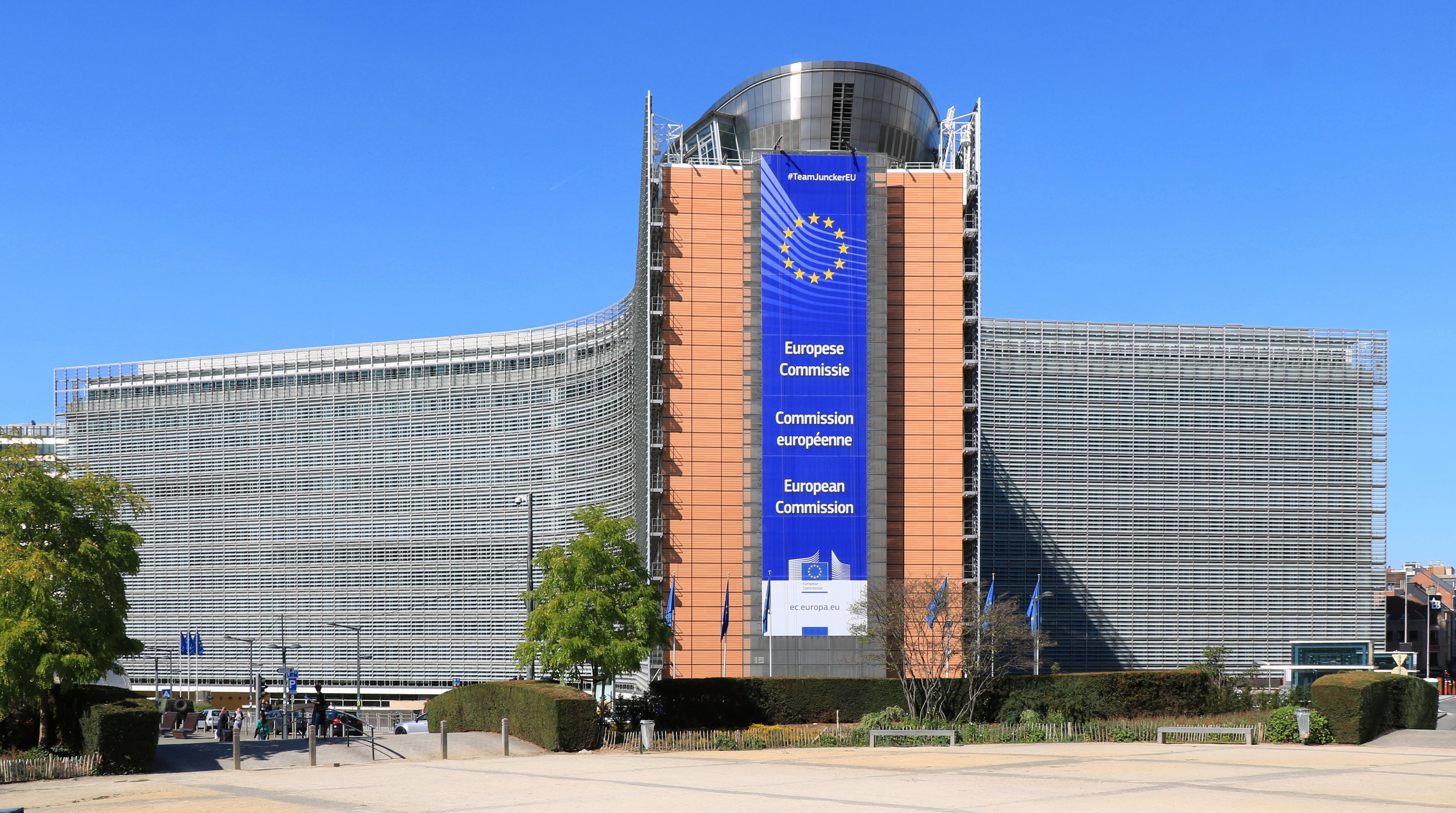
The Berlaymont Building, seat of the European Commission in Brussels.

The Commission of the European Communities was officially renamed European Commission.

The Treaty of Lisbon stated that the size of the Commission will reduce from one per member state to one for two-thirds of member states from 2014, with an equal rotation over time. This would have ended the arrangement which has existed since 1957 of having at least one Commissioner for each Member State at all times. However, the Treaty also provided that the European Council could unanimously decide to alter this number. Following the first Irish referendum on Lisbon, the European Council decided in December 2008 to revert to one Commissioner per member state with effect from the date of entry into force of the Treaty.

The person holding the new post of High Representative of the Union for Foreign Affairs and Security Policy automatically becomes also a Vice-President of the Commission.

Signed
In force
Document
1951
1952
Paris Treaty
1957
1958
Rome treaties: EEC Treaty Euratom Treaty
1965
1967
Merger Treaty
2007
2009
Lisbon Treaty

Commission of the European Atomic Energy Community
Commission of the European Communities
European Commission

High Authority of the European Coal and Steel Community

Commission of the European Economic Community

=== Foreign relations and security ===
==== High Representative ====
In an effort to ensure greater coordination and consistency in EU foreign policy, the Treaty of Lisbon created a High Representative of the Union for Foreign Affairs and Security Policy, de facto merging the post of High Representative for the Common Foreign and Security Policy and the European Commissioner for External Relations and European Neighbourhood Policy. The High Representative is Vice-President of the Commission, the administrator of the European Defence Agency but not the Secretary-General of the Council of Ministers, which reverts to being a separate administrative post. He or she has a right to propose defence or security missions. In the proposed constitution this post was called the Union Minister of Foreign Affairs.

The High Representative for Foreign Affairs and Security Policy is in charge of an External Action Service also created by the Treaty of Lisbon. This is essentially a common Foreign Office or Diplomatic Corps for the Union.

==== Mutual solidarity ====
Under the Treaty of Lisbon, Member States should assist if a member state is subject to a terrorist attack or the victim of a natural or man-made disaster (but any joint military action is subject to the provisions of Article 31 of the consolidated Treaty of European Union, which recognises various national concerns). In addition, several provisions of the treaties have been amended to include solidarity in matters of energy supply and changes to the energy policy within the EU.

==== Defence prospects ====
The treaty foresees that the European Security and Defence Policy will lead to a common defence for the EU when the European Council resolves unanimously to do so, and provided that all member states give their approval through their usual constitutional procedures. Additionally, the area of defence has become available to enhanced co-operation, potentially allowing for a defence integration that excludes member states with policies of neutrality. Countries with significant military capabilities are envisioned to form a Permanent Structured Cooperation in Defence.

=== Legal consolidation ===
Prior to the entry into force of the Treaty of Lisbon, the Union comprised a system of three legal pillars, of which only the European Communities pillar had its own legal personality. The Treaty of Lisbon abolished this pillar system, and as a consolidated entity, the European Union succeeded the legal personality of the European Communities. Therefore, the EU is now able to sign international treaties in its own name. The European Union gained for example membership of the World Trade Organization immediately after the entry into force of the Treaty of Lisbon, since the European Communities was already a member of that organisation.

=== EU evolution timeline ===
Since the end of World War II, most sovereign European countries have entered into treaties and thereby co-operated and harmonised policies (or pooled sovereignty) in an increasing number of areas, in the European integration project or the construction of Europe (French: la construction européenne). The following timeline outlines the legal inception of the European Union (EU) — the principal framework for this unification. The EU inherited many of its present organisations, institutions and responsibilities from the European Communities (EC), which were founded in the 1950s in the spirit of the Schuman Declaration.

Legend:
S: signing
F: entry into force
T: termination
E: expiry
de facto supersession
Rel. w/ EC/EU framework:
de facto inside
outside

European Union (EU)
[Cont.]
European Communities (EC)
(Pillar I)

European Atomic Energy Community (EAEC or EURATOM)

[Cont.]

/ / / European Coal and Steel Community (ECSC)

(Distr. of competences)

European Economic Community (EEC)

Schengen Rules
European Community (EC)
TREVI
Justice and Home Affairs (JHA, pillar III)

/ North Atlantic Treaty Organisation (NATO)
[Cont.]
Police and Judicial Co-operation in Criminal Matters (PJCC, pillar III)

Anglo-French alliance
[Defence arm handed to NATO]
European Political Co-operation (EPC)

Common Foreign and Security Policy
(CFSP, pillar II)
Western Union (WU)
/ Western European Union (WEU)
[Tasks defined following the WEU's 1984 reactivation handed to the EU]

[Social, cultural tasks handed to CoE]
[Cont.]

Council of Europe (CoE)
Entente Cordiale
S: 8 April 1904
Dunkirk Treaty (Note: Although not EU treaties per se, these treaties affected the development of the EU defence arm, a main part of the CFSP. The Franco-British alliance established by the Dunkirk Treaty was de facto superseded by WU. The CFSP pillar was bolstered by some of the security structures that had been established within the remit of the 1955 Modified Brussels Treaty (MBT). The Brussels Treaty was terminated in 2011, consequently dissolving the WEU, as the mutual defence clause that the Lisbon Treaty provided for EU was considered to render the WEU superfluous. The EU thus de facto superseded the WEU.)
S: 4 March 1947
F: 8 September 1947
E: 8 September 1997
Brussels Treaty
S: 17 March 1948
F: 25 August 1948
T: 30 June 2011
London and Washington treaties
S: 5 May/4 April 1949
F: 3 August/24 August 1949
Paris treaties: ECSC and EDC (Note: Plans to establish a European Political Community (EPC) were shelved following the French failure to ratify the Treaty establishing the European Defence Community (EDC). The EPC would have combined the ECSC and the EDC.)
S: 18 April 1951/27 May 1952
F: 23 July 1952/?
E: 23 July 2002/—
Protocol Modifying and
Completing the Brussels Treaty
S: 23 October 1954
F: 6 May 1955
Rome treaties: EEC and EAEC
S: 25 March 1957
F: 1 January 1958
WEU-CoE agreement
S: 21 October 1959
F: 1 January 1960
Brussels (Merger) Treaty (Note: The European Communities obtained common institutions and a shared legal personality (i.e. ability to e.g. sign treaties in their own right).)
S: 8 April 1965
F: 1 July 1967
Davignon report
S: 27 October 1970
European Council conclusions
S: 2 December 1975
Single European Act (SEA)
S: 17/28 February 1986
F: 1 July 1987
Schengen Agreement and Convention
S: 14 June 1985/19 June 1990
F: 26 March 1995
Maastricht Treaty (Note: The treaties of Maastricht and Rome form the EU's legal basis, and are also referred to as the Treaty on European Union (TEU) and the Treaty on the Functioning of the European Union (TFEU), respectively. They are amended by secondary treaties.) (Note: Between the EU's founding in 1993 and consolidation in 2009, the union consisted of three pillars, the first of which were the European Communities. The other two pillars consisted of additional areas of cooperation that had been added to the EU's remit.)
S: 7 February 1992
F: 1 November 1993
Amsterdam Treaty
S: 2 October 1997
F: 1 May 1999
Nice Treaty
S: 26 February 2001
F: 1 February 2003
Lisbon Treaty (Note: The consolidation meant that the EU inherited the European Communities' legal personality and that the pillar system was abolished, resulting in the EU framework as such covering all policy areas. Executive/legislative power in each area was instead determined by a distribution of competencies between EU institutions and member states. This distribution, as well as treaty provisions for policy areas in which unanimity is required and qualified majority voting is possible, reflects the depth of EU integration as well as the EU's partly supranational and partly intergovernmental nature.)
S: 13 December 2007
F: 1 December 2009

=== Defined policy areas ===
In the Lisbon Treaty the distribution of competences in various policy areas between Member States and the Union is explicitly stated in the following three categories:

Competences of the European Union in relation to those of its member states

Exclusive competence

Shared competence

Supporting competence

The Union has exclusive competence to make directives and conclude international agreements when provided for in a Union legislative act as to …
- the customs union
- the establishing of the competition rules necessary for the functioning of the internal market
- monetary policy for the Member States whose currency is the euro
- the conservation of marine biological resources under the common fisheries policy
- Common Commercial Policy
- conclusion of certain international agreements

Member States cannot exercise competence in areas where the Union has done so, that is …
- the internal market
- social policy, for the aspects defined in TFEU
- economic, social and territorial cohesion
- agriculture and fisheries, excluding the conservation of marine biological resources
- environment
- consumer protection
- transport
- trans-European networks
- energy
- the area of freedom, security and justice
- common safety concerns in public health matters, for the aspects defined in TFEU

Union exercise of competence shall not result in Member States being prevented from exercising theirs in …
- research, technological development and (outer) space
- development cooperation, humanitarian aid

The Union coordinates Member States policies or implements supplemental to their common policies not covered elsewhere in …
- the coordination of economic, employment and social policies
- common foreign, security and defence policies

The Union can carry out actions to support, coordinate or supplement Member States' actions in …
- the protection and improvement of human health
- industry
- culture
- tourism
- education, youth, sport and vocational training
- civil protection (disaster prevention)
- administrative cooperation

=== Enlargement and withdrawal procedure ===
A proposal to enshrine the Copenhagen criteria for further enlargement in the treaty was not fully accepted as there were fears it will lead to Court of Justice judges having the last word on who could join the EU, rather than political leaders.

The treaty introduces an exit clause for members wanting to withdraw from the Union. This formalises the procedure by stating that a member state must inform the European Council before it can terminate its membership, and a withdrawal agreement would then be negotiated between the Union and that State, with the Treaties ceasing to be applicable to that State from the date of the agreement or, failing that, within two years of the notification unless the State and the Council both agree to extend this period. There have been several instances where a territory has ceased to be part of the Community, e.g. Greenland in 1985, though no member state had ever left at the time the Lisbon Treaty was ratified. Before the Lisbon Treaty came into force, the question of whether a member state had a legal right to leave the union was unclear. On 30 March 2017, the United Kingdom gave notice of Britain's intention to leave the European Union. After negotiating a Brexit withdrawal agreement, the UK left the Union on 31 January 2020.

A new provision in the Treaty of Lisbon is that the status of French, Dutch and Danish overseas territories can be changed more easily, by no longer requiring a full treaty revision. Instead, the European Council may, on the initiative of the member state concerned, change the status of an overseas country or territory (OCT) to an outermost region (OMR) or vice versa. This provision was included on a proposal by the Netherlands, which was investigating the future of the Netherlands Antilles and Aruba in the European Union as part of an institutional reform process that was taking place in the Netherlands Antilles.

=== Revision procedures ===
The Lisbon Treaty creates two different ways for further amendments of the European Union treaties: an ordinary revision procedure which is broadly similar to the present process in that it involves convening an intergovernmental conference, and a simplified revision procedure whereby Part three of the Treaty on the Functioning of the European Union, which deals with Union policies and internal actions, could be amended by a unanimous decision of the European Council subject to ratification by all member states in the usual manner.

The Treaty also provides for the passerelle clauses which allows the European Council to unanimously decide to move from unanimous voting to qualified majority voting, and move from a special legislative procedure to the ordinary legislative procedure.

==== Ordinary revision procedure ====
1. Proposals to amend the treaties are submitted by a Member State, the European Parliament or the European Commission to the Council of Ministers who, in turn, submit them to the European Council and notify member states. There are no limits on what kind of amendments can be proposed.
2. The European Council, after consulting the European Parliament and the Commission, votes to consider the proposals on the basis of a simple majority, and then either:
  - The President of the European Council convenes a convention containing representatives of national parliaments, governments, the European Parliament and the European Commission, to further consider the proposals. In due course, the convention submits its final recommendation to the European Council.
  - Or the European Council decides, with the consent of the European Parliament, not to convene a convention, and set the terms of reference for the inter-governmental conference itself.
3. The President of the European Council convenes an inter-governmental conference consisting of representatives of each member-state's government. The conference drafts and finalises a treaty based on the convention's recommendation or on the European Council's terms of reference.
4. EU leaders sign the treaty.
5. All member states must then ratify the treaty "in accordance with their respective constitutional requirements", if it is to come into force.

==== Simplified revision procedure ====
1. Proposals to amend Part three of the Treaty on the Functioning of the European Union are submitted by a Member State, the European Parliament or the European Commission to the Council of Ministers who, in turn, submit them to the European Council and notify member states. Proposed amendments cannot increase the competences of the Union.
2. The European Council, after consulting the European Parliament and the Commission, votes to adopt a decision amending Part three on the basis of the proposals by unanimity.
3. All member states must approve the decision "in accordance with their respective constitutional requirements", if it is to come into force.

==== The passerelle clause ====
The treaty also allows for the changing of voting procedures without amending the EU treaties. Under this clause the European Council can, after receiving the consent of the European Parliament, vote unanimously to:

- allow the Council of Ministers to act on the basis of qualified majority in areas where they previously had to act on the basis of unanimity. (This is not available for decisions with defence or military implications.)
- allow for legislation to be adopted on the basis of the ordinary legislative procedure where it previously was to be adopted on the basis of a special legislative procedure.

A decision of the European Council to use either of these provisions can only come into effect if, six months after all national parliaments had been given notice of the decision, none object to it.

== Opt-outs ==
=== Opt-outs for justice and home affairs ===
Under the former third pillar, the Council of Ministers could adopt measures relating to justice and home affairs. These laws did not come within the body of European Community law, and had only the optional jurisdiction of the European Court of Justice. The Commission could not bring enforcement action against any member state for failing to implement or for failing to correctly implement third pillar measures.

The UK and Ireland had a flexible opt-out from justice and home affairs measures and could choose to participate in them on a case-by-case basis.

Under the Treaty of Lisbon, the limitations on the powers of the Court of Justice and the Commission would be lifted after a transitional period of five years which expired on 30 November 2014.

In order to avoid submitting to the jurisdiction of the Court of Justice and to enforcement actions by the Commission, the UK negotiated an opt-out which allowed them the option of a block withdrawal from all third pillar measures they had previously chosen to participate in.

In October 2012 the UK government announced that it intended to exercise this opt-out and then selectively opt back into certain measures.

The use of this opt-out by the UK did not affect the UK's flexible opt-out from justice and home affairs measures, or Ireland's identical opt-out.

== See also ==
- History of the European Union
- Signing of the Treaty of Lisbon
- Treaties of the European Union
- Timeline of European Union history
- Three pillars of the European Union
