= Recommendation (European Union) =

Non-legally-binding acts of the EU

A recommendation in the European Union, according to Article 288 of the Treaty on the Functioning of the European Union (formerly Article 249 TEC), is one of two kinds of non-legally binding acts cited in the Treaty of Rome, the other being an opinion.

Recommendations are without legal force but are negotiated and voted on according to the appropriate procedure. Recommendations differ from regulations, directives and decisions, in that they are not binding for Member States. Though without legal force, they do have a political weight. The recommendation is an instrument of indirect action aiming at preparation of legislation in Member States, differing from the Directive only by the absence of obligatory power.

Article 292 notes that the European Commission may make recommendations, and in specific cases the European Central Bank may also make recommendations.

== Common market ==
According to the terms of the Treaty on European Union "In order to ensure the proper functioning and development of the common market, the Commission (…) formulate recommendations or deliver opinions on matters dealt with in this Treaty, if it expressively so provides or if the Commission considers it necessary."

Concretely, recommendations can be used by the commission to raze barriers of competition caused by the establishment or the modification of internal norms of a Member State. If a country does not conform to a recommendation, the Commission cannot propose the adoption of a Directive aimed at other Member States, in order to elide this distortion.

== Examples ==
The European Council issued a recommendation on the promotion of positive action for women at work on 13 December 1984, and the European Commission issued a recommendation on the protection of the dignity of women and men at work on 27 November 1991. A code of practice on measures to combat sexual harassment was appended to the latter recommendation, which put forward recommended actions for employers, trade unions and employees in the public and private sectors in all member states.

== See also ==
- EUR-Lex
