= Policy measures of the European Union =

The European Union uses a range of legal instruments to implement policy, varied across two major decision-making processes co-decision and cooperation procedure.

== Green Paper ==
Green Papers are usually used to launch a consultation process. They present Commission policy orientations for debate to interested parties who may wish to comment. The Commission will generally prepare a subsequent proposal.

== White Paper ==
White Papers communicate a decided Commission policy or approach on a particular issue. They are chiefly intended as statements of Commission policy, rather than a consultation or starting point for debate.

== Communication ==
Communications usually set out a Commission action plan (may include concrete proposals for legislation).

== Regulation ==
Regulations, once approved, are immediately applicable and binding in all EU member states. No legislation is required at a national government level.

== Directive ==
Directives occur when a decision at an EU level is used to direct member state governments on what to do. Directives specify the results to be achieved and the deadline within which to achieve them, but form and methods of implementation are left at the discretion of member states.

== Recommendation ==
Recommendations are similar in structure to Directives but they do not hold any legal obligation. There are often described as soft law, and the Commission has been accused of using Recommendations to avoid lengthy and politically sensitive consultations.

== Decision ==
Decisions (by Council or Commission) apply specifically to one or more member states and are directly binding.
