= Ioannina compromise =

1994 European political compromise

The Ioannina compromise (also spelled Joanina) takes its name from an informal meeting of foreign ministers of the states of the European Union which took place in the Greek city of Ioannina on 27 March 1994.

Among the decisions taken at the meeting was a Council decision on the question of qualified majority voting in an enlarged 16-member European Community. The decision was later adjusted in the light of Norway's decision not to join.

The resulting compromise laid down that if members of the Council representing between 23 votes (the old blocking minority threshold) and 26 votes (the new threshold) expressed their intention of opposing the taking of a decision by the Council by qualified majority, the Council will do all within its power, within a reasonable period of time, to reach a satisfactory solution that can be adopted by at least 68 votes out of 87.

A declaration annexed to the Treaty of Amsterdam extended this compromise until the next enlargement took effect. The Ioannina compromise was superseded by the provisions of the Treaty of Nice.

It came up again during the negotiations about the Treaty of Lisbon on 21 and 22 June 2007 in Brussels. From 2014 to 31 March 2017, a new version of the 1994 Ioannina compromise was in effect, which allowed a potential blocking minority to block discussion of a matter before it could be put up for vote under qualified majority.
