= Legal act of the European Union =

Official legal act issued by institutions of the European Union

Legal acts of the European Union are actions which are adopted by the institutions of the European Union in order to exercise the powers given to them by the EU Treaties. The treaties form the "primary law" of the EU, while regulations, directives, decisions, recommendations and opinions constitute the Union's "secondary law".

Regulations, directives and decisions are binding legal acts. Recommendations and opinions are non-legislative acts which have no binding effect on the EU member states or institutions.

Regulations and directives can be either legislative or non-legislative acts. Legislative acts are normally adopted by the Council of the European Union and the European Parliament acting together, and have their legal basis in the treaties. Non-legislative acts are adopted by the European Commission in pursuance with powers given to it by legislative acts. Their function is to fill in the detail omitted by legislative acts.

== Principal types ==
- A regulation becomes immediately enforceable as law in all member states simultaneously. It can be considered as equivalent to a pan-European act of parliament.
- A directive requires member states to achieve a particular result without dictating the means of achieving that result.
- A decision is binding in its entirety. A decision which specifies those to whom it is addressed is only binding on them.
- Recommendations are non-binding.
- Opinions are also non-binding.

== See also ==
- EUR-Lex European Union legal acts
- Law of the European Union
