= Trilogue meeting =

Type of interinstitutional negotiation

A trilogue meeting is a type of interinstitutional negotiation used in the European Union (EU) legislative process. The bodies involved in trilogue negotiations are the European Commission, the Council of the European Union, and the European Parliament. The European Commission takes on the mediating function.

It takes its name from a literary form, the trilogue, which is discussion consisting of three parties. Most references to "trilogues" in European legal studies refer to informal trilogue meetings. However, a conciliation committee, an official part of the ordinary legislative procedure (OLP) provided for in the EU treaties, is sometimes referred to as a "formal trilogue meeting".

== Procedure ==
Due to its informal nature, trilogues are not provided for in the EU treaties. Some aspects of trilogues are regulated in the European Parliament Rules of Procedure. The content of trilogues is not regulated nor publicized, aside from the resulting legislation, which must still be approved by OLP.

Despite a lack of public information, there is some knowledge of the typical procedure within trilogue meetings. Negotiations are facilitated by a shared "four-column" document. This document includes a column for the position of each institution, as well as a column for the resulting compromise text. The negotiating teams for each institution regularly report back to their colleagues throughout the process in order to remain within their negotiating mandate. The resulting agreement is sent to the responsible ministers in the Council and the responsible committee in the European Parliament, before being formally approved by the Council and the EP plenary.

== Increasing usage ==
Trilogue negotiations are considered important for efficient law-making in the current system of ordinary legislative procedure, as they have allowed laws to be passed much more quickly than otherwise would be possible. The trilogue became common practice as a result of changes to the codecision procedure in the Amsterdam Treaty, which allowed legislation to be adopted in first reading for the first time. In 1999–2000, only 17% of legislation was adopted in first reading; by 2008–2009, 80% of proposals were adopted in first reading.

In recent years, more and more legislation has been passed in first reading due to trilogues. 99% of "new European laws" are quickly passed as compromises reached through trilogues. 90% of the 8th Parliament's concluded OLP files were given mandates to be negotiated in trilogues during the first reading. Most of the non-negotiated files were either low-urgency (codifications, transpositions) or high-urgency (international trade, Brexit-related).

== Controversy ==
Critics argue that the use of informal trilogues is "non-democratic, non-accountable and non-transparent". A central complaint about the lack of transparency is the general rule that four-column documents are never made public, either before or after negotiations. Others argue that some institutional secrecy is necessary to successfully negotiate without outside pressure. There have also been concerns that lobbying interests with extensive social networks in Brussels may have significantly more access to information regarding ongoing trilogues than ordinary citizens.

The European Ombudsman concluded a "strategic inquiry into the transparency of trilogues" in 2016. The Parliament's practices did not constitute maladministration, while the Council's practices did constitute maladministration. The Ombudsman proposed that all three institutions in trilogues should publicize trilogue dates, initial positions, trilogue agendas, four-column documents, provisional texts, a list of representatives at the trilogue, and a list of tabled documents.

There have been gradual improvements in trilogue transparency. Beginning in 2007, the European institutions formally recognized the trilogue as an important tool in the legislative process through a joint declaration. In more recent years, institutional positions have often been publicized within press releases. Additionally, in the 2018 case De Capitani v European Parliament, the General Court of the European Union declared that the Parliament was required to "grant access, on specific request, to documents relating to ongoing trilogues".
