= Hard law =

Applicable, enforceable law

Hard law refers to actual binding legal instruments and laws. In contrast with soft law, hard law gives individuals, states, and international actors actual binding responsibilities as well as rights, which can be enforced in a court.

The term is common in international law, where there are no sovereign governing bodies.

Hard law means binding laws. To constitute law, a rule, instrument or decision must be authoritative and prescriptive. In international law, hard law includes self-executing treaties or international agreements, as well as customary laws. These instruments result in legally enforceable commitments for countries (states) and other international subjects.

The relationship between hard and soft law is that "Hard law does not replace soft law but serves as a supplement," where hard law is "to ensure compliance where a more consensus-based approach has proven inadequate." (Emphasis provided.) More technically, "Hard law establishes the core obligations for states to follow, while soft law provides the definitions, standards, and guidance to fill in those obligations' gaps in practice (Thürer, 2008)."

Sources of international hard law include:

- Treaties (also known as conventions or international agreements)
- United Nations Security Council Resolutions
- Customary International Law
- Criminal law
