= Book of Quantum =

The Book of Quantum is a general guideline to the level of compensation which someone may be awarded in a personal injury lawsuit in the Republic of Ireland. It was first published in June 2004 and a revised version was published in October 2016. Ireland's Courts have a statutory requirement to refer to the Book when assessing damages in respect of any injuries, and the Book is also used by the Personal Injuries Assessment Board (PIAB) in its assessments. The revised general guidelines were prepared by international consultants based on data from the Courts, State Claims Agency, insurers' settlements and PIAB assessments.

In April 2021 the Book of Quantum was withdrawn and was replaced by the Personal Injury Guidelines.
