= European Union legislative procedure =

- European Union flag

Type
- Houses: Council of the European Union; European Parliament; National parliaments of the European Union

History
- Founded: 1 December 2009

Leadership
- Presidency of the Council of the European Union: Ireland since 1 July 2026
- President of the European Parliament: Roberta Metsola, EPP since 18 January 2022

Structure
- EU Council political groups: No official division by political groups
- EU Parliament political groups: 8: EPP (184); S&D (135); PfE (85); ECR (84); Renew (78); Greens/EFA (53); The Left (45); ESN (27); NI (32); Vacant (1)
- EU Council committees: 10 configurations: Agriculture and fisheries; Competitiveness; Economic and financial affairs; Education, youth, culture and sport; Employment, social policy, health and consumer affairs; Environment; Foreign affairs; General affairs; Justice and home affairs; Transport, telecommunications and energy
- EU Parliament committees: 22: Budgets; Budgetary Control; Economic & Monetary Affairs; Employment & Social Affairs; Environment, Public Health & Food Safety; Industry, Research & Energy; Internal Market & Consumer Protection; Transport & Tourism; Regional Development; Agriculture & Rural Development; Fisheries; Culture & Education; Legal Affairs; Civil Liberties, Justice & Home Affairs; Constitutional Affairs; Women's Rights & Gender Equality; Petitions; Foreign Affairs; Human Rights; Security & Defence; Development; International Trade
- Joint committees: Conciliation committee

Meeting place
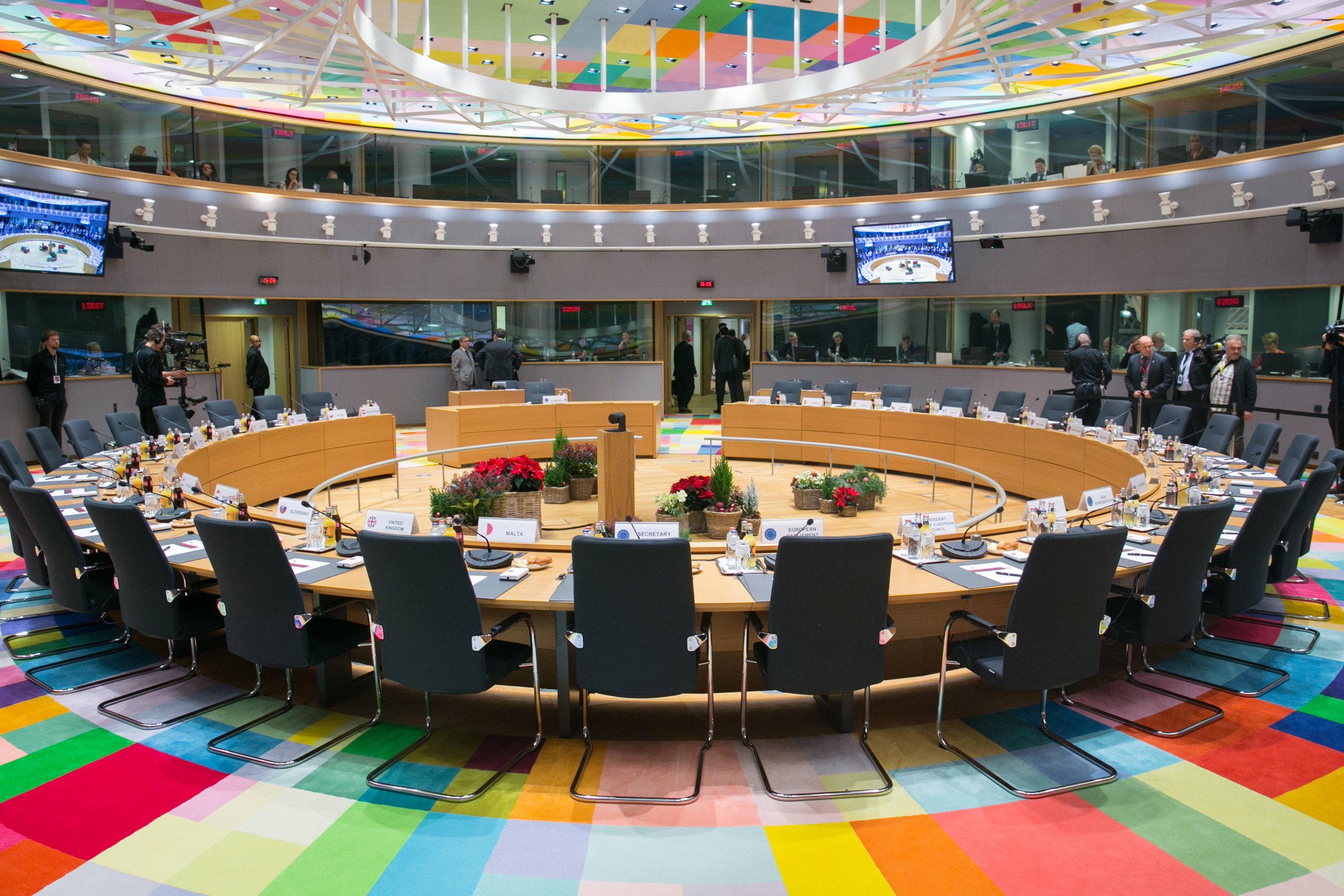
- Europa building: Council of the EU's seat since 2017 in Brussels, Belgium
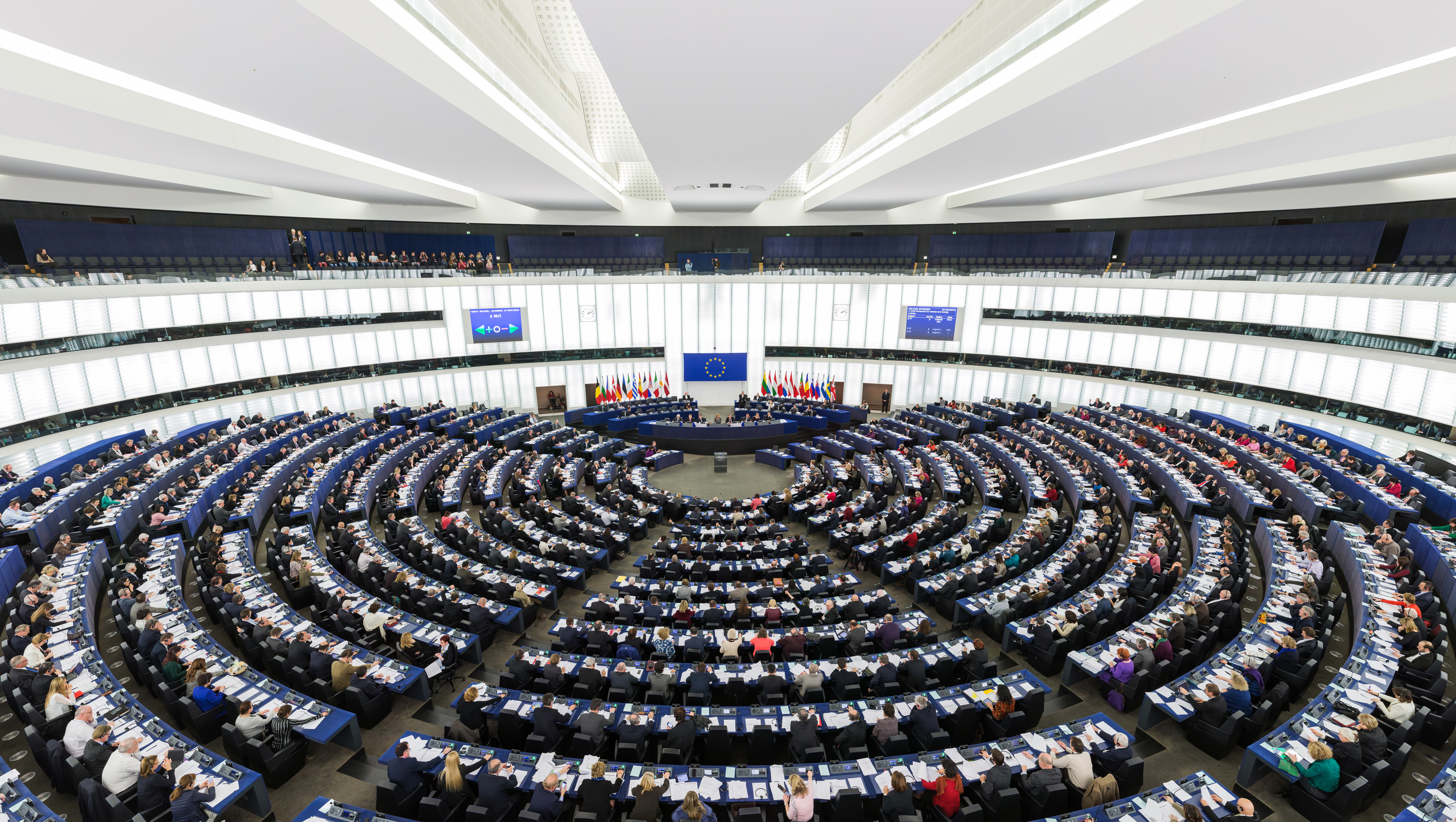
- Louise Weiss: European Parliament's seat since 1999 in Strasbourg, France

The European Union adopts legislation through a variety of procedures. The procedure used for a given legislative proposal depends on the policy area in question. Most legislation needs to be proposed by the European Commission and approved by the Council of the European Union and European Parliament to become law.

Over the years the power of the European Parliament within the legislative process has been greatly increased from being limited to giving its non-binding opinion or excluded from the legislative process altogether, to participating with the Council in the legislative process.

The power to amend the Treaties of the European Union, sometimes referred to as the Union's primary law, or even as its de facto constitution, is reserved to the member states and must be ratified by them in accordance with their respective constitutional requirements. An exception to this are so-called passerelle clauses in which the legislative procedure used for a certain policy area can be changed without formally amending the treaties.

== Participants ==
Since December 2009, after the Lisbon Treaty came into force, three EU institutions have been the main participants in the legislative process: the European Parliament, the Council of the European Union and the European Commission, with the national parliaments of the EU playing a further role. The legislative and budgetary functions of the union are jointly exercised by the Parliament and the Council, which are referred to as the Union legislator in a protocol to the EU treaties.

The precise nature of this organisation has been discussed extensively in academic literature, with some categorising the European Union as bicameral or tricameral, though the European Union itself has not accepted such categorisation and it is generally considered to be sui generis by observers, given the unique dynamics between the legislative bodies not found in traditional tricameralism.

Political system of the European Union

=== European Commission ===
The Commission has a virtual monopoly on the introduction of legislation into the legislative process, a power which gives the Commission considerable influence as an agenda setter for the EU as a whole. And while the Commission frequently introduces legislation at the behest of the Council or upon the suggestion of Parliament, what form any legislative proposals introduced take is up to the Commission.

Under the ordinary legislative procedure (see below), the negative opinion from the Commission also forces the Council to vote by unanimity rather than majority except when a conciliation committee has been set up. There are also limited instances where the Commission can adopt legislation without the approval of other bodies (see below).

=== European Parliament ===
The European Parliament's 720 members are directly elected every five years by universal suffrage. It organises itself as a normal multi-party parliament in conducting most of its work in its committees and sitting in political groupings rather than national delegations. However, its political groups are very weak due to their status as broad ideological groups of existing national parties.

The Parliament's powers have grown considerably since the 1950s as new legislative procedures granted more equality between Parliament and Council. It has also become a requirement that the composition of the European Commission be subject to a vote of approval as a whole by the Parliament. However, the choice of candidates remains the jurisdiction of the Council of the European Union, and the European Commission retains the sole power of legislative initiative. Taken into account that the Commission (and also the Council) are the antagonists of the parliament in the system of separation of powers this is considered a democratic deficit.

=== Council of the European Union ===
The Council of the EU (also known as "the council of ministers" and simply "the council") represents the national governments of member states, and hence its composition is essentially the number of member states (27) though votes are weighted according to the population of each state (see procedures below for clarification). As such, it does not sit according to political groups and rather than conducting most of its work in committees, much of its work is done by its preparatory bodies (the Working Parties and COREPER).

=== National parliaments ===
The national parliaments of EU member states have an "early warning mechanism" whereby if one third raise an objection – a "yellow card" – on the basis that the principle of subsidiarity has been violated, then the proposal must be reviewed. If a majority do so – an "orange card" – then the Council or Parliament can vote it down immediately. If the logistical problems of putting this into practice are overcome, then the power of the national parliaments could be decried as an extra legislature, without a common debate or physical location: dubbed by EU Observer a "virtual third chamber".

== Ordinary legislative procedure ==
Ordinary legislative procedure

The ordinary legislative procedure is the main legislative procedure by which directives and regulations are adopted. It was formerly known as the codecision procedure, and is sometimes referred to as the 'community method' as a contrast to the 'intergovernmental methods' which can variously refer to the consultation procedure or to the open method of co-ordination.

Article 294 TFEU outlines the ordinary legislative procedure in the following manner. The Commission submits a legislative proposal to the Parliament and Council. At the first reading Parliament adopts its position. If the Council approves the Parliament's wording then the act is adopted. If not, it shall adopt its own position and pass it back to Parliament with explanations. The Commission also informs Parliament of its position on the matter. At the second reading, the act is adopted if Parliament approves the Council's text or fails to take a decision. The Parliament may reject the Council's text, leading to a failure of the law, or modify it and pass it back to the Council. The Commission gives its opinion once more. Where the Commission has rejected amendments in its opinion, the Council must act unanimously rather than by majority.

If, within three months of receiving Parliament's new text, the Council approves it, then it is adopted. If it does not, the Council President, with the agreement of the Parliament President, convenes the Conciliation Committee composed of the Council and an equal number of MEPs (with the attendance as moderator of the Commission). The committee draws up a joint text on the basis of the two positions. If within six weeks it fails to agree on a common text, then the act has failed. If it succeeds and the committee approves the text, then the Council and Parliament (acting by majority) must then approve said text (third reading). If either fails to do so, the act is not adopted.

The procedure was introduced with the Maastricht Treaty as the codecision procedure and was initially intended to replace the Cooperation procedure (see below). The codecision procedure was amended by the Treaty of Amsterdam and the number of legal bases where the procedure applies was greatly increased by both the latter treaty and the Treaty of Nice. It was renamed the ordinary legislative procedure and extended to nearly all areas such as agriculture, fisheries, transport, structural funds, the entire budget and the former third pillar by the Treaty of Lisbon.

=== Trilogue ===
The trilogue is an informal type of meeting used in the EU's ordinary legislative procedure. It involves representatives of the European Parliament (EP), the Council of the EU and the European Commission. The trilogues are equally tripartite meetings, although the EC operates as a mediator between the EP and the Council. The trilogue negotiations aim at bringing the three institutions to an agreement, to fast-track the ordinary legislative procedure. The expression "formal trilogue" is sometimes used to describe meetings of the Conciliation Committee, which take place between the second and the third reading of a legislative proposal. However, the term trilogue is mostly referred to interinstitutional informal negotiations that can take place in any stage of the ordinary legislative procedure, from the first stage to the stage of the formal conciliation procedure. The agreements reached in trilogues still need to be approved through the formal procedures of each of the three institutions. Trilogues have been "formalised" in 2007 in a joint declaration of the EP, the Council and the EC but they are not regulated by primary legislation.

The evolution of the European integration process, together with the evolution of EP's role as co-legislator have produced an increase in the number of the trilogue meetings. During 2009–2014 legislative term, when the Treaty of Lisbon came into force and the co-decision procedure became ordinary legislative procedure – establishing the role of the EP and the Council of the EU as co-legislators – 85% of legislative acts were approved in first reading, 13% were approved in second reading while only 2% were included in the conciliation procedure. This trend corresponds to an increase in the number of trilogues (over 1500 in the same period) and it is seen as a proof of the effectiveness of the trilogues in fast tracking the legislative procedure.

The principal tool used in trilogues is the four column document, a working sheet divided in four sections, each of them comprising the positions of the three EU institutions. The first column is dedicated to the position of the EC, the second one to the position of the EP, the third one to the position of the Council. The fourth and final column is left to the compromised text that is meant to emerge. However, although the first two positions are public, the other two have often textual elements that have not been adopted and the content of the fourth column remains inaccessible to public. Trilogues have been criticised for a lack of transparency and democratic legitimacy. The European Ombudsman, the EU body responsible of investigating complaints about poor administration by EU institutions and other bodies, in 2015 has launched a strategic inquiry to establish the need for a reform of the trilogue, setting out proposals for more transparency.

== Special legislative procedures ==
The treaties have provision for special legislative procedures to be used in sensitive areas. These see the Council adopt alone with just the involvement of the other. Notable procedures are the consultation and consent procedures, though various others are used for specific cases.

=== Consultation procedure ===
Under this procedure the Council, acting either unanimously or by a qualified majority depending on the policy area concerned, can adopt legislation based on a proposal by the European Commission after consulting the European Parliament. While being required to consult Parliament on legislative proposals, the Council is not bound by Parliament's position. In practice the Council would frequently ignore whatever Parliament might suggest and even sometimes reach an agreement before receiving Parliament's opinion. However, the European Court of Justice has ruled that the Council must wait for Parliament's opinion and the Court has struck down legislation that the Council adopted before Parliament gave its opinion.

Before the Single European Act, the Consultation procedure was the most widely used legislative procedure in the then European Community. Consultation is still used for legislation concerning internal market exemptions and competition law. The procedure is also used in relation to the Union's advisory bodies such as the Committee of the Regions and the Economic and Social Committee that are required to be consulted under a range of areas under the treaties affecting their area of expertise. Such a procedure takes place in addition to consultation with the European Parliament or the other legislative procedures.

=== Consent procedure ===
In the consent procedure (formerly assent procedure), the Council can adopt legislation based on a proposal by the European Commission after obtaining the consent of Parliament. Thus Parliament has the legal power to accept or reject any proposal but no legal mechanism exists for proposing amendments. Parliament has however provided for conciliation committee and a procedure for giving interim reports where it can address its concerns to the Council and threaten to withhold its consent unless its concerns are met. This applies to admission of members, methods of withdrawal, subsidiary general legal basis provision and combating discrimination.

=== Incorporation into domestic law ===
The domestic legal systems of Member States are mostly a legacy of different historical legislation each of which has to be adapted in order to play an essential role in ensuring the standards of European Union law are implemented effectively, and uniformly. Member States governments have a EU treaty obligation to amend their existing primary and secondary legislation in a way that is reasonably consistent and comprehensible to individuals and businesses in order to enforce EU legislation and directives consistently and reliably across all the various jurisdictions of each member state of the European Union in a timely manner.

== Non-legislative procedures ==
=== Commission and Council acting alone ===
Under this procedure the Council can adopt legal acts proposed by the Commission without requiring the opinion of Parliament. The procedure is used when setting the common external tariff (Article 31 (ex Article 26)) and for negotiating trade agreements under the EU's Common Commercial Policy (Article 207(3)). However, formally speaking these acts are not legislative acts.

=== Commission acting alone ===
In a few limited areas, the Commission has the authority to adopt regulatory or technical legislation without consulting or obtaining the consent of other bodies. The Commission can adopt legal acts on its own initiative concerning monopolies and concessions granted to companies by Member States and concerning the right of workers to remain in a Member State after having been employed there (Article 45(3)(d) TFEU). Two directives have been adopted using this procedure: one on transparency between member states and companies and another on competition in the telecommunications sector. Formally speaking, these acts are not legislative acts.

=== Treaty revisions ===
The 2009 Lisbon Treaty created two different ways for further amendments of the European Union treaties: an ordinary revision procedure which is broadly similar to the past revision process in that it involves convening an intergovernmental conference, and a simplified revision procedure whereby Part three of the Treaty on the Functioning of the European Union, which deals with internal policy and action of the Union, could be amended by a unanimous decision of the European Council, provided there is no change to the field of competence of the EU, and subject to ratification by all member states in the usual manner.

The Treaty also provides for the Passerelle Clause which allows the European Council to unanimously decide to replace unanimous voting in the Council of Ministers with qualified majority voting in specified areas with the previous consent of the European Parliament, and move from a special legislative procedure to the ordinary legislative procedure.

==== Ordinary revision procedure ====
1. Proposals to amend the treaties are submitted by a Member State, the European Parliament or the European Commission to the Council of Ministers who, in turn, submit them to the European Council and notify member states. There are no limits on what kind of amendments can be proposed.
2. The European Council, after consulting the European Parliament and the Commission, votes to consider the proposals on the basis of a simple majority, and then either:
  - The President of the European Council convenes a convention containing representatives of national parliaments, governments, the European Parliament and the European Commission, to further consider the proposals. In due course, the convention submits its final recommendation to the European Council.
  - Or the European Council decides, with the agreement of the European Parliament, not to convene a convention and sets the terms of reference for the inter-governmental conference itself.
3. The President of the European Council convenes an inter-governmental conference consisting of representatives of each member-state's government. The conference drafts and finalises a treaty based on the convention's recommendation or on the European Council's terms of reference.
4. EU leaders sign the treaty.
5. All member states must then ratify the treaty "in accordance with their respective constitutional requirements", if it is to come into force.

==== Simplified revision procedure ====
1. Proposals to amend Part three of the Treaty on the Functioning of the European Union are submitted by a Member State, the European Parliament or the European Commission to the Council of Ministers who, in turn, submit them to the European Council and notify member states. Proposed amendments cannot increase the competences of the Union.
2. The European Council, after consulting the European Parliament and the Commission, votes to adopt a decision amending Part three on the basis of the proposals by unanimity.
3. All member states must approve the decision "in accordance with their respective constitutional requirements", if it is to come into force.

==== The Passerelle Clause ====
The Passerelle Clause allows for the changing of voting procedures without amending the EU treaties. Under this clause the European Council can, after receiving the consent of the European Parliament, vote unanimously to:

- allow the Council of Ministers to act on the basis of qualified majority in areas where they used to have to act on the basis of unanimity, except for decisions with defence or military implications.
- allow for legislation to be adopted on the basis of the ordinary legislative procedure where it previously was to be adopted on the basis of a special legislative procedure.

A decision of the European Council to use either of these provisions can come into effect only if, six months after all national parliaments had been given notice of the decision, none objects.

== Legal acts ==
Legal acts resulting from these procedures can come in a number of forms. A regulation is a law that has direct effect; for example the roaming charges regulation which immediately set price limits on mobile phone calls made in another EU state. A directive needs to be transposed, within certain limits, into national law; for example the Copyright Duration Directive which was transposed in Greece as Law No. 2557/1997 and Ireland as European Communities (Term of protection of Copyright) Regulations, 1995. A decision has direct effect, but only relating to a specific person or entity, and there are also various other non-binding instruments.

== See also ==
- Cooperation procedure
- Recasting (EU law)
