= Timeline of the European Union =

This is a timeline of the European Union.

== Distinct periods ==
- Ideas before 1948
- 1948–1957
- 1958–1972
- 1973–1993
- 1993–2004
- 2004–present

== Individual years ==
European Coal and Steel Community

1950s
1952
1953
1954
1955
1956
1957

European Economic Community

1950s
1958
1959

1960s
1960
1961
1962
1963
1964
1965
1966

European Communities

1960s
1967
1968
1969

1970s
1970
1971
1972
1973
1974
1975
1976
1977
1978
1979

1980s
1980
1981
1982
1983
1984
1985
1986
1987
1988
1989

1990s
1990
1991
1992

European Union

1990s
1993
1994
1995
1996
1997
1998
1999

2000s
2000
2001
2002
2003
2004
2005
2006
2007
2008
2009

2010s
2010
2011
2012
2013
2014
2015
2016
2017
2018
2019

2020s
2020
2021
2022
2023
2024
2025
2026

== Key events ==
- 1948 – Treaty of Brussels establishing the Western Union;
- 1948 – Formation of the International Authority for the Ruhr
- 1949 – Treaty of London establishing the Council of Europe
- 1950 – Schuman Declaration proposes pooling French and German markets for coal and steel
- 1951 – Treaty of Paris creates the European Coal and Steel Community (ECSC)
- 1954 – Paris Agreements; Western Union transformed into Western European Union
- 1957 – Treaty of Rome creates European Economic Community (by "The Six": Belgium, France, Italy, Luxembourg, the Netherlands and West Germany)
- 1963 – Ankara Agreement initiated a three-step process toward creating a Customs Union which would help secure Turkey's full membership in the EEC.
- 1963 – Charles de Gaulle vetoes UK entry
- 1967 – ECSC, EEC and Euratom merged
- 1973 – Accession of Denmark, Ireland and the UK
- 1979 – First direct elections to Parliament
- 1981 – Accession of Greece
- 1985 – Delors Commission, Greenland leaves Community.
- 1986 – Single European Act; Accession of Portugal and Spain; flag adopted
- 1987 – Turkey has applied to join the membership.
- 1989 – The fall of the Iron Curtain in Eastern Europe
- 1992 – Maastricht Treaty formally called the Treaty on European Union - The European Union is born and Euro was introduced as the fellow currency (Denmark and the UK are not included in the EMU (European Monetary Union)).
- 1993 – Copenhagen criteria defined
- 1995 – Accession of Austria, Finland and Sweden; Schengen area established
- 1997 – Treaty of Amsterdam
- 1999 – Fraud in the Commission results in resignation
- 1999 - The Euro as an 'accounting currency' officially replaces twelve national currencies
- 2002 – Euro banknotes and coins physically replace the twelve national currencies
- 2003 – Treaty of Nice
- 2004 – Accession of ten countries (Cyprus, Czech Republic, Estonia, Hungary, Latvia, Lithuania, Malta, Poland, Slovakia, Slovenia); signing of Constitution
- 2005 – France and the Netherlands reject the Constitution after own internal referendums (for France it was a binding one only)
- 2005 – Accession negotiations for full membership started with Croatia and Turkey.
- 2007 – Accession of Bulgaria and Romania
- 2009 – Lisbon Treaty abolishes the three pillars of the European Union
- 2013 – Accession of Croatia
- 2016 – UK holds a Membership Referendum and votes to leave the European Union
- 2017 – Start of Brexit: On 29 March 2017, the Government of the United Kingdom invoked Article 50 of the Treaty on European Union. The UK was due to leave the EU on 29 March 2019 at 11 p.m. GMT, when the period for negotiating a withdrawal agreement was set to end
- 2017 – Negotiations between UK and the EU officially started in June 2017
- 2020 – UK leaves the EU after the Brexit withdrawal agreement takes effect on 31 January 2020 at 11 p.m. GMT
- 2022 – Granted full candidacy status with Ukraine and Moldova.
- 2024 – Accession negotiations for full membership started with Moldova and Ukraine.

== Structural evolution ==
Since the end of World War II, most sovereign European countries have entered into treaties and thereby co-operated and harmonised policies (or pooled sovereignty) in an increasing number of areas, in the European integration project or the construction of Europe (French: la construction européenne). The following timeline outlines the legal inception of the European Union (EU) — the principal framework for this unification. The EU inherited many of its present organisations, institutions and responsibilities from the European Communities (EC), which were founded in the 1950s in the spirit of the Schuman Declaration.

Legend:
S: signing
F: entry into force
T: termination
E: expiry
de facto supersession
Rel. w/ EC/EU framework:
de facto inside
outside

European Union (EU)
[Cont.]
European Communities (EC)
(Pillar I)

European Atomic Energy Community (EAEC or EURATOM)

[Cont.]

/ / / European Coal and Steel Community (ECSC)

(Distr. of competences)

European Economic Community (EEC)

Schengen Rules
European Community (EC)
TREVI
Justice and Home Affairs (JHA, pillar III)

/ North Atlantic Treaty Organisation (NATO)
[Cont.]
Police and Judicial Co-operation in Criminal Matters (PJCC, pillar III)

Anglo-French alliance
[Defence arm handed to NATO]
European Political Co-operation (EPC)

Common Foreign and Security Policy
(CFSP, pillar II)
Western Union (WU)
/ Western European Union (WEU)
[Tasks defined following the WEU's 1984 reactivation handed to the EU]

[Social, cultural tasks handed to CoE]
[Cont.]

Council of Europe (CoE)
Entente Cordiale
S: 8 April 1904
Dunkirk Treaty (Note: Although not EU treaties per se, these treaties affected the development of the EU defence arm, a main part of the CFSP. The Franco-British alliance established by the Dunkirk Treaty was de facto superseded by WU. The CFSP pillar was bolstered by some of the security structures that had been established within the remit of the 1955 Modified Brussels Treaty (MBT). The Brussels Treaty was terminated in 2011, consequently dissolving the WEU, as the mutual defence clause that the Lisbon Treaty provided for EU was considered to render the WEU superfluous. The EU thus de facto superseded the WEU.)
S: 4 March 1947
F: 8 September 1947
E: 8 September 1997
Brussels Treaty
S: 17 March 1948
F: 25 August 1948
T: 30 June 2011
London and Washington treaties
S: 5 May/4 April 1949
F: 3 August/24 August 1949
Paris treaties: ECSC and EDC (Note: Plans to establish a European Political Community (EPC) were shelved following the French failure to ratify the Treaty establishing the European Defence Community (EDC). The EPC would have combined the ECSC and the EDC.)
S: 18 April 1951/27 May 1952
F: 23 July 1952/?
E: 23 July 2002/—
Protocol Modifying and
Completing the Brussels Treaty
S: 23 October 1954
F: 6 May 1955
Rome treaties: EEC and EAEC
S: 25 March 1957
F: 1 January 1958
WEU-CoE agreement
S: 21 October 1959
F: 1 January 1960
Brussels (Merger) Treaty (Note: The European Communities obtained common institutions and a shared legal personality (i.e. ability to e.g. sign treaties in their own right).)
S: 8 April 1965
F: 1 July 1967
Davignon report
S: 27 October 1970
European Council conclusions
S: 2 December 1975
Single European Act (SEA)
S: 17/28 February 1986
F: 1 July 1987
Schengen Agreement and Convention
S: 14 June 1985/19 June 1990
F: 26 March 1995
Maastricht Treaty (Note: The treaties of Maastricht and Rome form the EU's legal basis, and are also referred to as the Treaty on European Union (TEU) and the Treaty on the Functioning of the European Union (TFEU), respectively. They are amended by secondary treaties.) (Note: Between the EU's founding in 1993 and consolidation in 2009, the union consisted of three pillars, the first of which were the European Communities. The other two pillars consisted of additional areas of cooperation that had been added to the EU's remit.)
S: 7 February 1992
F: 1 November 1993
Amsterdam Treaty
S: 2 October 1997
F: 1 May 1999
Nice Treaty
S: 26 February 2001
F: 1 February 2003
Lisbon Treaty (Note: The consolidation meant that the EU inherited the European Communities' legal personality and that the pillar system was abolished, resulting in the EU framework as such covering all policy areas. Executive/legislative power in each area was instead determined by a distribution of competencies between EU institutions and member states. This distribution, as well as treaty provisions for policy areas in which unanimity is required and qualified majority voting is possible, reflects the depth of EU integration as well as the EU's partly supranational and partly intergovernmental nature.)
S: 13 December 2007
F: 1 December 2009

== See also ==
- History of the European Union
  - Ideas of European unity before 1948
  - History of European integration (1948–1957)
  - History of the European Communities (1958–1972)
  - History of the European Communities (1973–1993)
  - History of the European Union (1993–2004)
  - History of the European Union (2004–present)
- European Coal and Steel Community
- European Economic Community
