= 2022 in the European Union =

- Decades: 2000s; 2010s; 2020s
- See also: Other events of 2022; Timeline of EU history

Events from 2022 in the European Union.

== Incumbents ==
- (European Union) President of the European Council
  - (Belgium) Charles Michel
- (European Union) Commission President
  - (Germany) Ursula von der Leyen
- (European Union) Council Presidency
  - France (Jan – Jun)
  - Czech Republic (July – Dec)
- (European Union) Parliament President
  - (Malta) Roberta Metsola
- (European Union) High Representative
  - (Spain) Josep Borrell

== Events ==
=== January ===
- 1 January - France takes over the Presidency of the European Union.
- 6 January – The Lithuanian government announces that it will not extend the state of emergency at the external border with Belarus.
- 16 January - Serbians vote in a referendum on whether to approve a constitutional reform that would bring the Serbian judicial system closer to the model required for the country to join the European Union.
- 27 January - The European Medicines Agency conditionally approves the use of the Pfizer anti-COVID-19 oral drug Paxlovid for high-risk adult patients.

=== February ===
- 1 February - The European Union restricts the validity of the EU Digital COVID certificate to only nine months after having received their second dose of the COVID-19 vaccine.
- 16 February -
  - The European Court of Justice dismisses Poland and Hungary's challenges against the regulation and confirms that the regulation is in compliance with the treaties of the European Union. This will allow the European Commission to suspend funds from the EU budget to member states that have rule of law issues which are likely to affect the management of EU funds.
  - Bulgarian MEP from the VMRO – Bulgarian National Movement Angel Dzhambazki after defending the governments of Hungary and Poland in a speech at the European Parliament, Dzhambazki insulted his fellow MEP Sandro Gozi (Renew Europe) and apparently made a Nazi salute while leaving the chamber. Dzhambazki's actions were immediately censored by the Vice-President of the European Parliament Giuseppina Picierno, who was presiding over the session.
- 21 February - The European Union says it is prepared to issue sanctions against Russia if the country recognizes the Donetsk People's Republic and Luhansk People's Republic, breakaway regions of Ukraine that declared independence in 2014. Ukraine considers the quasi-states terrorist organizations.
- 22 February - The foreign ministers of European Union member states agree on a package of new sanctions against Russia.
- 24 February - The European Union says that it will introduce the "strongest, harshest package" of sanctions on the Russian economy in response to its invasion of Ukraine.
- 25 February - The European Union freezes all assets held by Russian President Vladimir Putin and Foreign Minister Sergey Lavrov in the EU.
- 27 February -
  - The European Union says that it will provide fighter aircraft and finance €500 million in procurement and delivery of weapons to Ukraine, the first time that the EU has done so. The EU will also provide €50 million in medical supplies.
  - Canada, the European Union, the United Kingdom, the United States and Japan freeze all assets of the Russian Central Bank and the Russian National Wealth Fund under their jurisdiction, preventing the usage of more than a third of Russia's $630 billion of foreign exchange reserves.
  - European Union airspace is closed to Russian aircraft.
  - The European Union imposes sanctions on Belarus, forbidding the import of some commodities, including timber, steel, oil-derived fuels and cement.
- 28 February -
  - In retaliation of the Russian aircraft ban, Russian authorities prohibit EU and UK airlines from landing in or crossing Russian airspace.
  - Ukrainian President Volodymyr Zelenskyy signs an application for the country to join the European Union.
  - Foreign minister of Germany Annalena Baerbock reacts to the accession request of Volodymyr Zelenskyy, saying that joining the Union cannot be done in a matter of months.
  - The presidents of 8 EU member states: Bulgaria, the Czech Republic, Estonia, Latvia, Lithuania, Poland, Slovakia and Slovenia jointly sign an open letter urging other member states to grant Ukraine candidate status immediately.

=== March ===
- 1 March - The European Parliament formally accepts Ukraine's application for EU membership.
- 2 March - The European Union removes seven Russian banks from the SWIFT financial messaging system, including VTB Bank, Novikombank, Promsvyazbank, Rossiya Bank, Sovcombank and VEB.RF.
- 3 March -
  - Georgia and Moldova both announce that they are applying for European Union membership.
  - Russian television network RT is taken off-air in the EU and the United Kingdom due to its coverage of the Russian invasion of Ukraine.
- 11 March - The EU announces that it will ban all imports of iron and steel goods from Russia, ban the export of luxury goods to Russia, and freeze Russia's cryptocurrency assets.
- 25 March - Finland's state-owned VR Group announces that it will suspend all train services on the Riihimäki–Saint Petersburg railway, which connects Helsinki and Saint Petersburg, on March 28. The suspension will close one of the last public transport routes to the European Union for Russians.

=== April ===
- 1 April - President of the European Parliament Roberta Metsola travels to Kyiv to meet with Ukrainian president Volodymyr Zelenskyy and chairman of the Verkhovna Rada Ruslan Stefanchuk, and subsequently addresses the Verkhovna Rada. Metsola becomes the first EU official to visit Ukraine since the Russian invasion began.
- 3 April – Viktor Orbán's Fidesz–KDNP alliance, Wins the Hungarian 2022 elections. Two days after the election, the European Commission president Ursula von der Leyen announced that the commission would begin cutting funding to Hungary over rule-of-law concerns.
- 9 April - EU High Representative Josep Borrell announces that the European Union and Italy will resume their diplomatic operations in Kyiv after temporarily relocating to Lviv.
- 12 April - The European Union suspends some of its military activities in Mali due to the alleged involvement of Russian private military companies in the conflict, especially during the Siege of Moura in March.
- 27 April - The European Commission proposes lifting all tariffs for Ukrainian produce not covered by the European Union–Ukraine Association Agreement for one year, while easing trade conditions for other goods. The temporary suspension will need to be approved by the European Parliament and the member states.

=== May ===
- 4 May - The European Union proposes to ban all oil imports from Russia by the end of the year, and also remove Russia's biggest bank, Sberbank, from SWIFT.
- 8 May - The European Union recommends that the United States remove the Islamic Revolutionary Guards Corps from their terrorist organization blacklist.
- 11 May - The European Union Aviation Safety Agency (EASA) and the European Centre for Disease Prevention and Control (ECDC) announce in a joint statement that, starting next week, masks are no longer required for flights or in airports. However, the EASA asks passengers to "behave responsibly and respect the choices of others around them," while the ECDC recommends that passengers continue to practice social distancing if it can be done in a non-disruptive manner.
- 18 May - Two EU members, Finland and Sweden, have applied for membership in NATO.
- 20 May - Russia announces that it will suspend its supply of natural gas to Finland beginning at 4:00 GMT tomorrow due to Finland's refusal to comply with Russia's demand that gas be paid for in rubles.
- 21 May - Russia's Gazprom suspends natural gas exports to Finland over Finland's refusal to comply with Russia's demand that gas be paid for in rubles.
- 30 May - After weeks of deliberations, all of the European Union member states agree to impose an oil embargo on most oil imports from Russia (with the exception of that brought by pipelines), to be fully implemented by the end of the year, and cut off Sberbank from SWIFT.
- 31 May - The United Kingdom and the European Union agree to implement a ban on insuring Russian oil tankers, which will be phased in beginning in 6 months. This will effectively render the vast majority of oil tankers uninsurable as most institutions conducting insurance are located in Western Europe.

=== June ===
- 1 June - Exit polls show that around two-thirds of Danes voted to have Denmark join the European Union's Common Security and Defence Policy, ending Denmark's 30-year policy of opting out.
- 7 June - The European Commission agrees to make USB Type-C the common charging port for all mobile phones, tablets and cameras in the European Union by autumn 2024.
- 9 June -
  - Poland decides to lift its state of emergency over attempts by migrants to cross the Belarus–Poland border, saying that the border barrier it has been building is mostly complete.
  - The European Parliament adopts a resolution urging to amend the treaties of the European Union in order to abolish the unanimity principle in decisionmaking with respect to sanctions and foreign policy and to grant the Parliament the right to legislative initiative.
- 13 June - The British government confirms that it will go ahead with plans to terminate the Northern Ireland Protocol in order to make it easier for goods to flow between Great Britain and Northern Ireland. The European Union accuses the UK of breaking international law by reneging on the agreement made during Brexit negotiations.
- 14 June - The European Union removes Russia's largest bank Sberbank, the Russian Agricultural Bank and the Credit Bank of Moscow from the SWIFT international payments system as part of another round of economic sanctions on Russia over its invasion of Ukraine.
- 15 June - The European Union launches legal action against the United Kingdom, alleging a breach of post-Brexit agreements regarding the Northern Ireland Protocol.
- 17 June - The European Commission recommends that the European Council grant Ukraine candidate status for accession to the European Union.
- 19 June - The European Union condemns the "structurally deficient" justice system in Bolivia and lack of "due process" in the trial of Jeanine Áñez and asks for her release.
- 23 June - The European Union formally awards official candidate status to Ukraine and Moldova.
- 24 June - Bulgaria lifts its veto against North Macedonia's bid to join the European Union.
- 30 June - The European Union signs a free trade agreement with New Zealand.

=== July ===
- 1 July - Czech Republic takes over the Presidency of the European Union.
- 12 July - The European Union formally accepts Croatia as the 20th member of the Eurozone. Croatia will adopt the bloc's currency on January 1, 2023.
- 13 July - The European Commission allows Russia to resume shipping embargoed goods by rail to its exclave of Kaliningrad, following Russian threats against Lithuania. However, the transit of military equipment through Lithuanian territory remains prohibited.
- 16 July - The Assembly of North Macedonia passes a motion to amend North Macedonia’s Constitution to recognize its Bulgarian minority, while pledging to discuss remaining issues with the Bulgarian government. In exchange, Bulgaria will allow membership talks with the European Union to begin.
- 19 July - Negotiations on the accession of North Macedonia and Albania to the European Union begin in Brussels.
- 20 July - The European Union bans imports of gold from Russia and freezes Sberbank's assets.
- 22 July - The European Commission launches four new legal procedures against the United Kingdom for alleged infringements of the Brexit Withdrawal Agreement relating to the passage of the Northern Ireland Protocol Bill.
- 26 July - European Union energy ministers approve legislation to lower demand for gas by some member countries by 15% from August until March 2023.
- 27 July - Russian energy company Gazprom reduces the amount of natural gas flowing through the Nord Stream 1 pipeline from Russia to Europe to 20% of the pipeline's capacity.
- 28 July - Authorities in Hanover, Germany, turn off heating and switch to cold showers in all public buildings, and also shut off public water fountains amid an energy crisis after Gazprom reduced gas supplies to Germany through its Nord Stream 1 pipeline.

=== August ===
- 9 August - Russia's Transneft says that Ukraine has suspended Russian oil flows through the Druzhba pipeline to the Czech Republic, Hungary and Slovakia after it was unable to pay transit fees to Ukraine's pipeline operator UkrTransNafta. The Czech Republic's pipeline company says it expects supplies through the pipeline to restart within several days.
- 18 August - The European Union statistics office reports that inflation in the Eurozone increased to a record 8.9% in July.

=== September ===
- September 22 – the Portuguese National Democratic Alternative leaves the European Democratic Party due to ideological divergencies regarding the LGBT community.
- September 24 – On the day before the 2022 Italian general election, Ursula von der Leyen, the president of the European Commission, was asked about possible Vladimir Putin allies in the Italian political system and the upcoming election, to which she replied that "if things go in a difficult direction, I've spoken about Hungary and Poland, we have tools." The comment garnered a strong backlash from some Italian politicians, especially from Salvini and Renzi.
- September 25 – The 2022 Italian general election is held to elect all 400 seats of the Chamber of Deputies and 200 seats of the Senate of the Republic. Observers commented that the results shifted the geopolitics of the European Union, following far-right gains in France, Spain, and Sweden. It was also noted that the election outcome would mark Italy's first far-right-led government and the country's most right-wing government since 1945.

=== October ===
- 17 October: The European Commission announce EU cohesion funds (75 billion euros) for Poland would be frozen.

=== December ===
- 22 December - The European Commission announced it would hold back all 22 billion euros of EU cohesion funds for Hungary until its government meets conditions related to judiciary independence, academic freedoms, LGBTQI rights and the asylum system.

== See also ==
=== Overviews ===
- European Union
- History of European Union
- Outline of European Union
- Politics of European Union
- Timeline of European Union history
- Years in European Union
- History of modern European Union
- Institutions of the European Union

=== Related timelines for current period ===
- 2022
- 2022 in Europe
- 2022 in politics and government
- 2020s
