= 2020 in the European Union =

- Decades: 2000s; 2010s; 2020s
- See also: Other events of 2020; Timeline of EU history

Events from 2020 in the European Union.

== Incumbents ==
- (European Union) President of the European Council – (Belgium) Charles Michel
- (European Union) Commission President – (Germany) Ursula von der Leyen
- (European Union) Council Presidency – Croatia (Jan – Jun 2020), Germany (July – Dec 2020)
- (European Union) Parliament President – (Italy) David Sassoli
- (European Union) High Representative – (Spain) Josep Borrell

== Events ==
=== January ===
- 31 January – The United Kingdom and Gibraltar left the European Union.

=== July ===
- July - The European Union refuses an offer of 500 million doses of Covid-19 vaccine from Pfizer-BioNTech.
- 29 July - Commissioner Dalli announced that applications for EU-funded town twinnings from six Polish towns had been rejected because of their adoption of "LGBT-free" or "family rights" resolutions.

=== August ===
- 18 August - Polish Justice Minister Zbigniew Ziobro announce that the town of Tuchów in southern Poland would now receive 250,000 zlotys ($67,800) from the ministry's Justice Fund, to compensate for the EU funding reversal for its supports for LGBT-free zone.

=== November ===
- 17 November – Hungary and Poland veto the seven-year EU budget, over attempts to link funding to respect for rule of law. They both said that linking funding to rule of law will mean a loss to their nation's sovereignty.

=== December ===
- 10 December – Hungary and Poland drop their veto on the EU budget linked to rule of law conditionality.
- 17 December – The European Court of Justice rules that EU states can ban kosher and halal ritual slaughter.

== See also ==
=== Country overviews ===
- European Union
- History of European Union
- Outline of European Union
- Politics of European Union
- Timeline of European Union history
- Years in European Union
- History of modern European Union
- Institutions of the European Union

=== Related timelines for current period ===
- 2020
- 2020 in politics and government
- 2020s
