= 2023 in the European Union =

- Decades: 2000s; 2010s; 2020s
- See also: Other events of 2023; Timeline of EU history

Events from 2023 in the European Union.

== Incumbents ==
- (European Union) President of the European Council
  - (Belgium) Charles Michel
- (European Union) Commission President
  - (Germany) Ursula von der Leyen
- (European Union) Council Presidency
  - Sweden (Jan – Jun)
  - Spain (July – Dec)
- (European Union) Parliament President
  - (Malta) Roberta Metsola
- (European Union) High Representative
  - (Spain) Josep Borrell

== Events ==
=== January ===
- 1 January –
  - Croatia adopted the euro and became the 20th member state of the eurozone. They entered the Schengen area and became the 23rd European union member to do so, and the 27th states to accede to the union overall
  - Sweden takes over the Presidency of the Council of the European Union.
- 4 January – Internet privacy regulators in Ireland fine Meta Platforms €390 million for violations of the General Data Protection Regulation on Facebook and Instagram.
- 10 January – the Polish town of Świdnik abolished their LGBT-free zone in response to fearing that they would stop receiving EU subsidies.
- 12 January - In Hungary, The European Commission blocks Fidesz-linked universities from signing new Erasmus+ and Horizon Europe grants.

=== April ===
- 25 April – The Carbon Border Adjustment Mechanism, a carbon tariff on carbon-intensive products imported to the European Union from countries lacking sufficient greenhouse gas reduction measures of their own, a key part of the Fit for 55 package, is approved.

=== June ===
- 15 June – In Poland, Jarosław Kaczyński, leader of the Law and Justice party, says that the government might hold a referendum on EU migration policy. The referendum would be similar to the 2016 Hungarian migrant quota referendum.

=== July ===
- 1 July – Spain takes over the Presidency of the Council of the European Union.
- 18 July – the EU decided not to restart full membership negotiations with Turkey.

=== October ===
- 12 October – After the 2023 Slovak parliamentary election, the Party of European Socialists (PES) suspended Smer-SD and Hlas-SD over their plans to enter into coalition with SNS, which the PES views as a "radical-right party."
- 15 October –
  - 2023 Polish referendum Results: 96.79% voted against the admission of thousands of illegal immigrants from the Middle East and Africa, 96.04% voted against the removal of the barrier on the border between Poland and Belarus.

=== November ===
- 28 November – The Court of Justice of the European Union rules that EU states can prohibit their employees from wearing signs of religious belief such as the Islamic headscarve.

=== December ===
- 14 December: the European Council agree to open accession negotiations with Ukraine, as well as Moldova. Hungary long opposed talks starting accession negotiations, did not veto the move. Prime Minister Viktor Orban left the room momentarily in what officials described as a pre-agreed and constructive manner, while the other 26 leaders went ahead with the vote.
- December: Start of the 2023–2024 European Union farmers' protests.

== See also ==
=== Overviews ===
- European Union
- History of European Union
- Outline of European Union
- Politics of European Union
- Timeline of European Union history
- Years in European Union
- History of modern European Union
- Institutions of the European Union

=== Related timelines for current period ===
- 2023
- 2023 in Europe
- 2023 in politics and government
- 2020s
