= 2025 in the European Union =

- Decades: 2000s; 2010s; 2020s
- See also: Other events of 2025; Timeline of EU history

Events from 2025 in the European Union.

== Incumbents ==
- (European Union) President of the European Council
  - (Portugal) António Costa
- (European Union) Commission President
  - (Germany) Ursula von der Leyen
- (European Union) Council Presidency
  - Poland (Jan – Jun)
  - Denmark (July – Dec)
- (European Union) Parliament President
  - (Malta) Roberta Metsola
- (European Union) High Representative
  - (Estonia) Kaja Kallas

== Events ==
=== January ===
- January 1
  - Poland takes over the Presidency of the Council of the European Union after Hungary.
  - Bulgaria and Romania complete the process of joining the Schengen Area, lifting land border controls.
- January 8–February 2 – The 2025 World Men's Handball Championship in Croatia, Denmark and Norway.
- January 12 – 2024–25 Croatian presidential election (second round): Incumbent president Zoran Milanović wins a second term in office with 74% of the vote.
- January 27 – Slovakia, Prime Minister: Robert Fico announces plans for constitutional amendments to the Constitution of Slovakia. One would place the constitution higher than international treaties and agreements, another would formally recognize only two genders (Male and female), restrict "gender transition" and prohibit the adoption of children by same-sex couples.
- January– During a debate about Trump talk about taking over Greenland. Danish People's Party Anders Vistisen in the EU parliament gave a speech in which he said: "It is not for sale. Let me put it into words you might understand, Mr. Trump: fuck off." His speech later went viral on Social Media,

=== February ===
- February 9 – Patriots.eu hosted a rally in Madrid with the theme 'Make Europe Great Again', which was addressed by Marine Le Pen, Geert Wilders, Santiago Abascal, Matteo Salvini, Andrej Babiš, Martin Helme, Krzysztof Bosak and other party leaders.
- February 12 – The Armenian parliament unanimously approves a bill to initiate Armenia's accession process to the European Union. The Armenian government states that the decision to pass the bill marks the first step in "the beginning of Armenia's accession process to the European Union".
- February 22 – Hungary, Prime Minister: Viktor Orbán delivers the annual State of the Nation address. He introduces expansion of some welfare measures, announces constitutional amendments to protect the " right to use cash", and to mandate the existence of only two genders. He also threatens to ban pride parades in Hungary.
- February 23 – 2025 German federal election was held.

=== March ===
- 1 March 1 – In Romania, Tens of thousands gather at an AUR protest in Bucharest in support of Călin Georgescu and against the annulment of the 2024 Romanian presidential election.
- March 8–March 17 – 2025 Special Olympics World Winter Games in Turin.
- March 9 – The Romanian Central Electoral Bureau rejects Călin Georgescu's candidacy for the 2025 Romanian presidential election, citing his failure to comply with electoral regulations that contributed to the annulment of the 2024 Romanian presidential election.
- March 15 – The Romanian Central Electoral Bureau rejects Diana Iovanovici Șoșoacă's candidacy for the 2025 Romanian presidential election. Becoming the second Far Right candidate to be excluded to run.
- March 31 – In France, Marine Le Pen from the National Rally (RN) is banned from running for political office for five years, meaning she cannot stand in the 2027 French presidential election.

=== April ===
- April 3-4 –
  - The first European Union–Central Asia summit is held in Samarkand, Uzbekistan
- April 9 –
  - In Germany, The CDU announces a coalition agreement with the SPD at the federal level.
  - The Alternative for Germany AfD finishes as the leading party for the first time in opinion polling.
- April 14 – The Hungarian Parliament passes the constitutional amendments outlawing public events by the LGBTQ+ community. The constitutional amendments, will also protect the "right to use cash", mandate the existence of only two genders (male or female).

=== May ===
- May 2 – The German Federal Office for the Protection of the Constitution designates the German Alternative for Germany AfD party as a right-wing extremist organisation.
- May 4/18 – 2025 Romanian presidential election was held.
- May 5 – The AfD sues the Federal Office for the Protection of Constitution, accusing it of violating the German constitution by trying to prosecute AfD for saying ideas which are considered freedom of speech and legitimate criticism of German immigration policies.
- May 18 – 2025 Polish presidential election was held.
- May 20 – the Hungarian National Assembly approved a bill to initiate the country's withdrawal from the International Criminal Court (ICC), marking Hungary as the first European Union member state to take such action.

=== June ===
- June 20 – Following the expulsion of Luxembourgish Alternative Democratic Reform Party (ADR) MEP Fernand Kartheiser from the ECR group for visiting Russia, the Patriots for Europe group approached the ADR for talks.

June 26 – Hungary holds a public consultation in which, of the 2 million people who participated, 95% voted against Ukraine joining the EU, while only 5% supported the bid.

=== July ===
- July – Ursula von der Leyen president of the European Commission survives a vote of confidence, 360-175. EPP, S&D, Renew Europe and Greens/EFA and parts of ECR supported her, While PfE, ESN, The Left and parts of ECR opposed her.
- July 17 – The Slovenia government designates Israeli National Security Minister Itamar Ben Gvir and Finance Minister Bezalel Smotrich "persona non grata" over their role in human rights violations against Palestinians. a first in the European Union.
- July 30 – The Slovenia government announces a complete ban on the import, export, and transit of arms and military equipment to and from Israel over its actions in the Gaza War. a first in the European Union.

=== September ===
- September 23 – The European Parliament rejects a petition by Prime Minister Orbán to lift the parliamentary immunity of Péter Magyar amid criminal investigations against the latter.
- September 26 – The National Council of Slovakia passes the government's constitutional amendment. It will give national law precedence over EU law, recognize only two genders (Male and female), ban surrogacy and adoption by same-sex couples. It will also include equal pay for men and women.

=== October ===
- October 3/4 – 2025 Czech parliamentary election was held.
- October 7–
  - The European Parliament lifts the immunity of Polish MEPs Daniel Obajtek and Michał Dworczyk as part of a corruption investigation against them.
  - The European Parliament narrowly rejects to lift the immunity of Italian MEP Ilaria Salis with the majority of a single vote (306 to 305). it was reported that members of the (ECR) and (PfE) broke ranks and defended Salis immunity.
- October 17 – Slovkia's SMER is expelled from the Party of European Socialists in a unanimous vote for violations of the group's values by party leader Robert Fico.
- October 27 – 2025 Irish presidential election was held.
- October 29 – 2025 Dutch general election was held.
- October 30 – Latvia's parliament Saeima voted 56 in favor and 32 opposed to exit the Istanbul Convention. If Latvia leaves, it would make Latvia the first European Union member to quit the treaty.

=== December ===
- December 4 - the US President Donald Trump released the National Security Strategy of his administration, The document devotes significant criticism to Europe, saying its economic problems are "eclipsed by the real and more stark prospect of civilizational erasure". It also says "Over the long term, it is more than plausible that within a few decades at the latest, certain NATO members will become majority non-European," The document calls for the US to prioritize "cultivating resistance to Europe’s current trajectory within European nations",

== See also ==
=== Overviews ===
- European Union
- History of European Union
- Outline of European Union
- Politics of European Union
- Timeline of European Union history
- Years in European Union
- History of modern European Union
- Institutions of the European Union

=== Related timelines for current period ===
- 2025
- 2025 in Europe
- 2020s
