= 2024 in the European Union =

- Decades: 2000s; 2010s; 2020s
- See also: Other events of 2024; Timeline of EU history

Events from 2024 in the European Union.

== Incumbents ==
- (European Union) President of the European Council
  - (Belgium) Charles Michel (to 30 November 2024)
  - (Portugal) António Costa (from 1 December 2024)
- (European Union) Commission President
  - (Germany) Ursula von der Leyen
- (European Union) Council Presidency
  - Belgium (Jan – Jun)
  - Hungary (July – Dec)
- (European Union) Parliament President
  - (Malta) Roberta Metsola
- (European Union) High Representative
  - (Spain) Josep Borrell (to 30 November 2024)
  - (Estonia) Kaja Kallas (from 1 December 2024)

== Events ==
=== January ===
- 1 January –
  - Belgium takes over the Presidency of the Council of the European Union.
  - Bulgaria and Romania join the Schengen Area for air and maritime travel, ending internal border controls at air and sea borders.

=== February ===
- The European Parliament adopts a resolution criticising rule-of-law and fundamental-rights concerns in Greece, including freedom of the press, surveillance and treatment of migrants.
- 1 February – The European Union formally approves a €50 billion financial support package for Ukraine after Hungary withdraws its veto. The package is expected to help the Ukrainian government pay pensions, salaries and other costs over the next four years with the first funds being released in March.

=== April ===
- 10 April – The European Parliament approved the European Migration and Asylum Pact.

=== May ===
- 14 May – The EU adopted its directive on combating violence against women and domestic violence.
- 15 May – Attempted assassination of Robert Fico: Prime Minister Robert Fico is critically injured in a shooting in Handlova. A suspect is apprehended and identified as a 71-year-old writer from Levice.
- 21 May – The Artificial Intelligence Act, a policy regulating providers of AI systems and entities using AI in a professional context to mitigate harms and risks of AI, is approved; it is the world's first comprehensive legal framework for artificial intelligence.
- 23 May – The German Alternative for Germany (AfD) is expelled from the Identity and Democracy.
- 24 May – A watered-down version of the Corporate Sustainability Due Diligence Directive, a policy to safeguard basic human rights such as child labor and environmental harms across EU supply chains, is approved.

=== June ===
- 6–9 June – 2024 European Parliament election
- 13 June – Hungary is fined 200 million euros, in addition to a daily one-million-euro fine by the European Court of Justice for "deliberately evading” compliance with European Union laws on migration and asylum seekers.
- 18 June – Hungary's Christian Democratic People's Party (KDNP) leaves the European People's Party. The Party is an ally of Hungary's Fidesz which also left the European People's Party in 2021.
- 21 June – The Czech ANO 2011 party decided to unilaterally withdraw from Alliance of Liberals and Democrats for Europe group as well as Renew Europe.
- 25 June – Accession negotiations for full membership started with Moldova and Ukraine.
- 30 June – Hungarian Prime Minister Viktor Orbán (Fidesz), former Czech Prime Minister Andrej Babiš (ANO 2011) and former Austrian Minister of the Interior Herbert Kickl (FPÖ) form a new European group called the Patriots for Europe.

=== July ===
- 1 July – The start of the 2024 Hungarian Presidency of the Council of the European Union.
- 10 July – the German Alternative for Germany (AfD) forms a new European group called Europe of Sovereign Nations. It will have Hungary's Our Homeland Movement, Bulgaria's Revival, Czech Freedom and Direct Democracy, Slovak Republic Movement.
- 18 July – Ursula von der Leyen addresses the European Parliament as candidate for a second European Commission presidency.
- 25 July – The Corporate Sustainability Due Diligence Directive enters into force, requiring large companies to address human-rights and environmental abuses in their supply chains.

=== September ===
- 16 September – The Estonian Centre Party leaves the Alliance of Liberals and Democrats for Europe Party, citing a policy divergence on issues of European integration between the Centre Party and ALDE.

=== October ===
- 16 October – The European Commission refers Hungary to the Court of Justice of the European Union over its Defense of National Sovereignty Act.

=== November ===
- Italy transfers migrants to Albania under its agreement to process certain asylum claims outside EU territory, marking a major EU debate over offshore asylum processing.

=== December ===
- 6 December — The EU and Mercosur reach a political agreement on an improved EU–Mercosur Partnership Agreement, following further negotiations from 2023 to 2024.
- 12 December — The European Commission adopts definitive countervailing duties on imports of battery electric vehicles (BEVs) from China, following an investigation that found Chinese BEV producers benefited from unfair government subsidies and posed a threat of economic injury to EU producers.

== See also ==
=== Overviews ===
- European Union
- History of European Union
- Outline of European Union
- Politics of European Union
- Timeline of European Union history
- Years in European Union
- History of modern European Union
- Institutions of the European Union

=== Related timelines for current period ===
- 2024
- 2024 in Europe
- 2020s
