= 2021 in the European Union =

- Decades: 2000s; 2010s; 2020s
- See also: Other events of 2021; Timeline of EU history

The following events occurred in the European Union in 2021.

== Incumbents ==
- (European Union) President of the European Council
  - (Belgium) Charles Michel
- (European Union) Commission President
  - (Germany) Ursula von der Leyen
- (European Union) Council Presidency
  - Portugal (January–June 2021)
  - Slovenia (July–December 2021)
- (European Union) Parliament President
  - (Italy) David Sassoli
- (European Union) High Representative
  - (Spain) Josep Borrell

== Events ==
=== January ===
- 1 January – Portugal takes over the Presidency of the Council of the European Union.
- 6 January – The European Medicines Agency approves the Moderna COVID-19 vaccine for use within the European Union.
- 21 January – Hungary became the first European Union country to approve the Russian Sputnik V COVID-19 vaccine.

=== March ===
- 3 March – Hungary's Fidesz party led by Prime Minister Viktor Orbán decided to leave the EPP Group, after the EPP Group's new rules.

=== April ===
- 1 April – The Polish Prime Minister Mateusz Morawiecki, and Italian former Minister of the Interior and leader of Northern League Matteo Salvini visit Hungary to meet with Hungarian Prime Minister: Viktor Orbán. It was wildly reported by the media they talked about forming a New Nationalist Conservative political group of the European Parliament to counter European People's Party group.
- 12 April: The start of the 2021 Balkan non-papers.
  - The paper called for the "peaceful dissolution" of Bosnia and Herzegovina with the annexation of Republika Srpska and great parts of Herzegovina and Central Bosnia into a Greater Serbia and Greater Croatia, leaving a small Bosniak state in what is central and western Bosnia,

=== July ===
- 1 July – Slovenia takes over the Presidency of the Council of the European Union.
- 2 July – The leaders of "right-wing parties" from 16 EU countries, signs in several European capitals a document calling for deep reform of the EU. The document is signed by Hungary's Viktor Orbán Fidesz, Poland's Jarosław Kaczyński Law and Justice, Finland's Finns Party, Italy's Brothers of Italy and Lega, Spain's VOX, France's Marine le Pen National Rally, Bulgaria's VMRO, Austria's Freedom Party of Austria (FPÖ), Belgium's (Vlaams Belang), Denmark's Danish People's Party, Estonia's EKRE, Greece's Greek Solution, Netherlands(Ja21), Lithuania (Lietuvos lenkų rinkimų akcija) and Romania (Partidul Național Țărănesc Creștin Democrat.
- 7 July — The start of the 2021–2022 Belarus–European Union border crisis begins.
- 14 July — The Polish Constitutional Tribunal rules that any interim measures from the top European court against Poland's judicial reforms were "not in line" with the Polish constitution. the Polish justice minister, Zbigniew Ziobro, said the constitutional court's decision was "against interference, usurpation and legal aggression by organs of the European Union".

=== September ===
- September 6 — the European Commission sent letters to several Polish regional councils indicating that EU funds would be withdrawn if they do not abandon their LGBT-free zone policy.

=== October ===
- October 7 — The Polish Constitutional Tribunal rules that some articles in EU treaties are "incompatible" with its national legislation and unconstitutional. it also ruled that Poland's constitution takes precedence over some EU laws.

=== December ===
- 24 December – Polish Leader Jarosław Kaczyński said Germany is trying to turn the EU into a federal "German Fourth Reich".

== See also ==
=== Country overviews ===
- European Union
- History of European Union
- Outline of European Union
- Politics of European Union
- Timeline of European Union history
- Years in European Union
- History of modern European Union
- Institutions of the European Union

=== Related timelines for current period ===
- 2021
- 2021 in politics and government
- 2020s
