= 2017 in the European Union =

- Decades: 1990s; 2000s; 2010s; 2020s
- See also: Other events of 2017; Timeline of EU history

Events in the year 2017 in the European Union.

== Incumbents ==
- (European Union) President of the European Council
  - (Poland) Donald Tusk
- (European Union) Commission President
  - (Luxembourg) Jean-Claude Juncker
- (European Union) Council Presidency
  - Malta (Jan – Jun 2017)
  - Estonia (July – Dec 2017)
- (European Union) Parliament President
  - (Germany) Martin Schulz (until January 17)
  - (Italy) Antonio Tajani (from January 17)
- (European Union) High Representative
  - (Italy) Federica Mogherini

== Events ==
=== January ===
- 1 January
  - Malta takes over the six-month rotating presidency of the Council of EU.
  - Aarhus (Denmark) and Pafos (Cyprus) are the European Capitals of Culture for 2017. Both cities will host events to promote their local culture.

=== March ===
- March 16 - Turkey's Minister of the Interior Süleyman Soylu threatens to send to Europe 15,000 refugees a month.

=== July ===
- 1 July – Estonia takes over the six-month rotating presidency of the Council of EU.
- 6 July – the European Parliament unanimously accepted the call for the suspension of full membership negotiations between the EU and Turkey.

=== September ===
- 16 September European Union official announced United States will not treaty Paris Climate, after withdrew Paris Agreement.

=== November ===
- 17 November Social summit for fair jobs and growth in Gothenburg

== European Capitals of Culture ==
- Aarhus, Denmark
- Pafos, Cyprus

== See also ==
- History of the European Union
- Timeline of European Union history
