= 2016 in the European Union =

- Decades: 1990s; 2000s; 2010s; 2020s
- See also: Other events of 2016; Timeline of EU history

Events in the year 2016 in the European Union.

== Incumbents ==
- (European Union) President of the European Council
  - (Poland) Donald Tusk
- (European Union) Commission President
  - (Luxembourg) Jean-Claude Juncker
- (European Union) Council Presidency
  - Netherlands (Jan – Jun 2016)
  - Slovakia (July – Dec 2016)
- (European Union) Parliament President
  - (Germany) Martin Schulz
- (European Union) High Representative
  - (Italy) Federica Mogherini

== Events ==
=== January ===
- 1 January
  - Netherlands takes over the six-month rotating presidency of the Council of EU.
  - San Sebastián (Spain) and Wrocław (Poland) are the European Capitals of Culture for 2016. Both cities will host events to promote their local culture.

=== February ===
- Turkish president Recep Tayyip Erdoğan threatens to send the millions of refugees in Turkey to EU member states, saying: "We can open the doors to Greece and Bulgaria anytime and we can put the refugees on buses ... So how will you deal with refugees if you don't get a deal? Kill the refugees?"

=== May ===
- On 26 May 2016 the European Commission issued letters of formal notice to 21 member states who had failed to notify the Commission of their transposition of one or more of the three new public procurement directives into their national laws by the due date.
- Pact of Amsterdam, 30 May 2016: EU ministers responsible for urban policy agree to allow European cities to have more influence in EU policies across 12 priority policy areas critical to the development of urban areas.

=== June ===
Of the 382 voting areas in the United Kingdom and Gibraltar a total of 270 returned majority votes in favour of "Leave" whereas 129 returned majority votes in favour of "Remain" in the referendum, including all 32 areas in Scotland. Leave Remain

- The Commission, Parliament, Council and other partners issued a "standardisation package" on "European Standards for the 21st Century" on 1 June, explaining "why standards matter".
- The United Kingdom held a referendum on European Union membership on 23 June and voted to leave the EU.

=== July ===
- 1 July
- Slovakia takes over the six-month rotating presidency of the Council of EU.

=== October ===
- 2 October – 2016 Hungarian migrant quota referendum: 3,362,224 or 98.36% of valid votes reject EU's mandatory migrant quotas.

== European Capitals of Culture ==
- San Sebastián, Spain
- Wrocław, Poland

== See also ==
- History of the European Union
- Timeline of European Union history
