= 2015 in the European Union =

- Decades: 1990s; 2000s; 2010s; 2020s
- See also: Other events of 2015; Timeline of EU history

Events in the year 2015 in the European Union.

2015 was designated as the:

- European Year for Development

== Incumbents ==
- (European Union) President of the European Council
  - (Poland) Donald Tusk
- (European Union) Commission President
  - (Luxembourg) Jean-Claude Juncker
- (European Union) Council Presidency
  - Latvia (Jan – Jun)
  - Luxembourg (July – Dec)
- (European Union) Parliament President
  - (Germany) Martin Schulz
- (European Union) High Representative
  - (Italy) Federica Mogherini

== Events ==
=== January ===
- 1 January
  - Lithuania officially adopts the euro as its currency, replacing the litas, and becomes the 19th Eurozone country.
  - Latvia takes over the six-month rotating presidency of the council of the EU.
  - The European Commission launches the European Year of Development, focused on raising awareness of development across Europe.
  - Mons, and Plzeň are the European Capitals of Culture 2015.
- 7 January – A terrorist attack on the satirical magazine Charlie Hebdo in Paris leads to demonstrations, all over Europe in support of freedom of expression, as well as new initiatives at European level to fight terrorism.
- January – The Hungarian town Mayor of Ásotthalom László Toroczkai calls for a Hungarian border barrier in the south of the country, to deal with the growing 2015 migrant crisis.

=== February ===
- 13 February – EU leaders meet at an informal European Council in Brussels to discuss three challenges facing Europe: restoring peace in Ukraine, fighting terrorism and improving the European Monetary Union, particularly in the light of the change of government in Greece, whose new Prime Minister, Alexis Tsipras, asks for a review of its situation.
- 25 February – The European Commission sets out its strategy to achieve a resilient Energy Union with forward-looking climate change policy.

=== March ===
- 18 March – The European Commission presents a package of tax transparency measures as part of its agenda to tackle corporate tax avoidance and harmful competition in the EU.
- 19 March – Meeting in the European Council, EU leaders agree to create an Energy Union. They underline their commitment to providing affordable, secure and sustainable energy within the EU.

=== April ===
- 23 April – At a special meeting of the European Council in Brussels, EU leaders agree on four priority areas for action in response to the 1,800 lives lost in the Mediterranean where migrants attempt the perilous journey to Europe in boats. These include measures to fight traffickers, a new return programme for irregular migrants, more protection for refugees from conflict areas, and tripled resources for the EU's search and rescue operations in the Central Mediterranean.
- 30 April – following the murder of a woman in southern Hungary, Hungarian Prime Minister Viktor Orbán suggests that Hungary must reinstate capital punishment. This statement caused a strong reaction by EU officials, and Orbán had to retract it as a result.

=== May ===
- 6 May – The European Commission unveils detailed plans to create a Digital Single Market, laying the groundwork for Europe's digital future.
- 7 May – The Conservative party wins a majority in the United Kingdom general election. The party confirms that an "in-out" referendum on membership of the European Union will be held before the end of 2017.
- 13 May – As part of the "European Semester", the Commission adopts recommendations for each of the 28 EU countries, offering guidance on 2015-2016 national budgets and economic policies.
- 21–22 May – At a summit in Riga, EU leaders meet with the representatives of the six countries of the Eastern Partnership (Armenia, Azerbaijan, Belarus, Georgia, Moldova and Ukraine). They set out an agenda for the future, including the need to establish strengthened and more transparent institutions, free from corruption.

=== June ===
- 7–8 June – Germany hosts the 41st G7 summit in Schloss Elmau, Bavaria. Discussions focus on global economy and climate change as well as on key foreign security and development issues.
- June – the Hungarian cabinet approves construction of a 4 metres (13 ft) high barrier to stop migrants.
- 22 June – Five EU Presidents reveal ambitious plans on how to deepen the Economic and Monetary Union between 2015 and 2025. The report is prepared by European Commission President (Jean-Claude Juncker), together with the President of the Euro summit (Donald Tusk), the president of the Eurogroup (Jeroen Dijsselbloem), the President of the European Central Bank (Mario Draghi), and the President of the European Parliament (Martin Schulz).
- 30 June – The European Parliament and the Council reach an agreement to end all mobile phone roaming fees within the EU by 2017.

=== August ===
- 19 August – EU finance ministers formally approve the first tranche of a new €86 billion bailout for Greece after parliaments in member states back the move.
- August 31 - German Chancellor Angela Merkel makes her we can do this statement during the 2015 European migrant crisis.

=== September ===
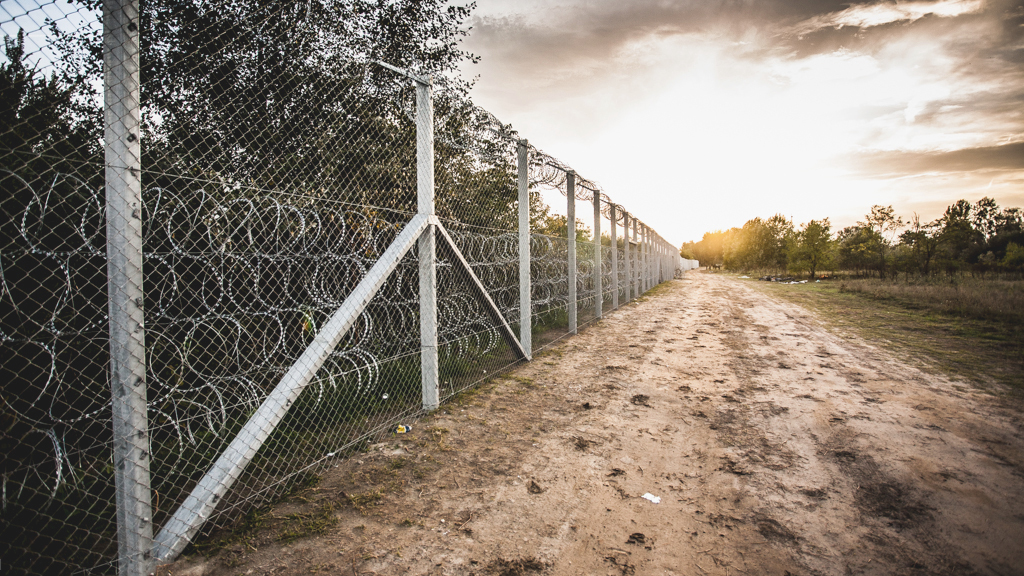
Hungary Serbia border barrier

National governments' position on 22 September 2015 European Union Justice and Home Affairs Council majority vote to relocate 120,000 refugees from Greece and Italy to other EU countries according to proportional quotas: Yes Opt-out Abstention No Non-EU state *Malta not seen/marked on map

- September – Hungary builds the Hungarian border barrier fence on its border with Serbia and Croatia.

== European Capitals of Culture ==
The European Capital of Culture is a city designated by the European Union for a period of one calendar year, during which it organises a series of cultural events with a strong European dimension.

- Mons, Belgium
- Plzeň, Czech Republic

== See also ==
- History of the European Union
- Timeline of European Union history
