= 2023 in Europe =

This is a list of events that have taken place in Europe in 2023.

== Incumbents ==
=== Albania ===
(Albania)

=== Andorra ===
(Andorra)

=== Azerbaijan ===
(Azerbaijan)

=== Belarus ===
(Belarus)

=== Belgium ===
(Belgium)

=== Bosnia and Herzegovina ===
(Bosnia and Herzegovina)

=== Bulgaria ===
(Bulgaria)

=== Croatia ===
(Croatia)

=== Czech Republic ===
(Czech Republic)

=== Cyprus ===
(Cyprus)

=== Denmark ===
(Denmark)

=== Estonia ===
(Estonia)

=== European Union ===
- President of the European Commission: Ursula von der Leyen
- President of the Parliament: Roberta Metsola
- President of the European Council: Charles Michel
- Presidency of the Council of the EU:
  - Sweden (January–June)
  - Spain (July–December)

=== Finland ===
(Finland)

=== France ===
(France)

=== Georgia ===
(Georgia (country))

=== Germany ===
(Germany)

=== Greece ===
(Greece)

=== Hungary ===
(Hungary)

=== Iceland ===
(Iceland)

=== Ireland ===
(Republic of Ireland)

=== Italy ===
(Italy)

=== Latvia ===
(Latvia)

=== Liechtenstein ===
(Liechtenstein)

=== Lithuania ===
(Lithuania)

=== Luxembourg ===
(Luxembourg)

=== Malta ===
(Malta)

=== Moldova ===
(Moldova)

=== Monaco ===
(Monaco)

=== Montenegro ===
(Montenegro)

=== Netherlands ===
(Netherlands)

=== North Macedonia ===
(North Macedonia)

=== Norway ===
(Norway)

=== Poland ===
(Poland)

=== Portugal ===
(Portugal)

=== Romania ===
(Romania)

=== Russia ===
(Russia)

=== San Marino ===
(San Marino)

=== Serbia ===
(Serbia)

=== Slovakia ===
(Slovakia)

=== Slovenia ===
(Slovenia)

=== Spain ===
(Spain)

=== Sweden ===
(Sweden)

=== Switzerland ===
(Switzerland)

=== Turkey ===
(Turkey)

=== Ukraine ===
(Ukraine)

=== United Kingdom ===
(United Kingdom)

=== Vatican City ===
(Vatican City)

== Events ==
=== January ===
- 1 January: Croatia adopted the euro and became the 20th member state of the eurozone. This was the first enlargement of the monetary union since Lithuania's entry in 2015. Croatia also joined the Schengen Area and became its 27th member. This was the first enlargement of the Schengen Area since Liechtenstein's entry in 2011.

=== April ===
- 4 April: Finland joins NATO.

=== May ===
- 6 May: Coronation of Charles III and Camilla in Westminster Abbey, London.
- 13 May: Eurovision Song Contest 2023 in Liverpool, United Kingdom.
- 14 May: 2023 Turkish general election
- 28 May: Recep Tayyip Erdoğan wins the 2023 presidential elections in Turkey.

=== June ===
- 15 June – In Poland, Jarosław Kaczyński, leader of the Law and Justice party, says that the government might hold a referendum on EU migration policy. The referendum would be similar to the 2016 Hungarian migrant quota referendum.

=== July ===
- 23 July: 2023 Spanish general election for the Cortes Generales.

=== October ===
- 15 October –
  - 2023 Polish referendum Results: 96.79% voted against the admission of thousands of illegal immigrants from the Middle East and Africa, 96.04% voted against the removal of the barrier on the border between Poland and Belarus.
- 28 October: A partial lunar eclipse will be visible in the evening and the next morning over Europe and most of Africa and Asia and will be the 11th lunar eclipse of Lunar Saros 146.

=== November ===
- 11 November: 2023 Polish parliamentary election for the Parliament of Poland.

=== December ===
- 14 December: the European Council agree to open accession negotiations with Ukraine, as well as Moldova. Hungary long opposed talks starting accession negotiations, did not veto the move. Prime Minister Viktor Orban left the room momentarily in what officials described as a pre-agreed and constructive manner, while the other 26 leaders went ahead with the vote.
- December: Start of the 2023–2024 European Union farmers' protests.

== See also ==
- 2023 in the European Union
- 2023 in politics and government
- List of state leaders in 2023 § Europe
