= Outline of Europe =

Continent in Northern Hemisphere

The following outline is provided as an overview of and topical guide to Europe.

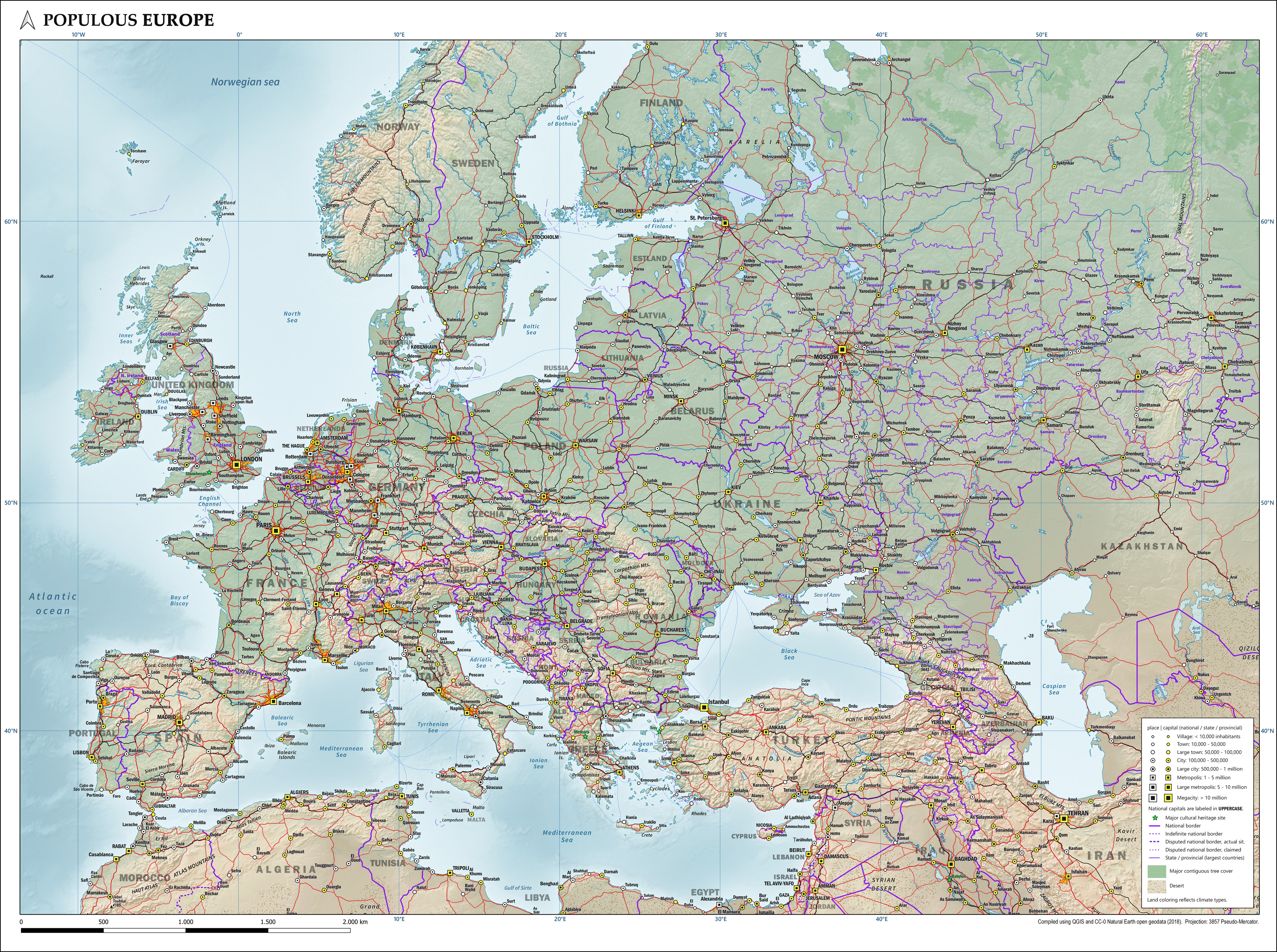

== Geography of Europe ==
- Atlas of Europe

=== Regions of Europe ===
- Central Europe
- Eastern Europe
- Northern Europe
- Southern Europe
- Western Europe
- United Nations geoscheme for Europe

=== Countries of Europe ===
List of European countries

- Coats of arms of Europe
- Flags of Europe
- List of European countries by GDP PPP
- List of European countries by population
- European microstates
- Monarchies in Europe

=== Cities in Europe ===
List of cities in Europe

=== Villages in Europe ===
List of villages in Europe by country

=== Geographic features of Europe ===
- List of World Heritage Sites in Europe
- List of islands of Europe
- List of rivers of Europe
- Geographical midpoint of Europe

== History of Europe ==
History of Europe

- Events preceding World War II in Europe
- Powder keg of Europe

=== History by field ===
- Military history of Europe

=== History by region ===
- History of Central Europe

== Culture of Europe ==
Culture of Europe

- Demographics of Europe
  - Aging of Europe
- Etiquette in Europe
- Religion in Europe
  - Islam in Europe
  - Christianity in Europe
  - Hinduism in Europe
- World Heritage Sites

=== The arts in Europe ===
- European dances

== Environment of Europe ==
- Fauna of Europe

== Economy and infrastructure of Europe ==
Economy of Europe

- Wind power in Europe

=== Communications in Europe ===
- List of newspapers in Europe
- List of radio stations in Europe
- List of television stations in Europe

== Education in Europe ==
- European studies

== Governments of Europe ==
- Council of Europe
- European Union
  - List of European Union-related topics

== Politics of Europe ==
Politics of Europe

- Capital punishment in Europe
- Conflicts in Europe
- European integration
- Political parties in Europe
- Pan-Europeanism
- Pirate radio in Europe

== See also ==
Europe

- Continent

Indexes of articles on the countries of Europe

Lists of topics on the countries of Europe
