= 2018 in the European Union =

- Decades: 1990s; 2000s; 2010s; 2020s
- See also: Other events of 2018; Timeline of EU history

Events in the year 2018 in the European Union.

== Incumbents ==
- (European Union) President of the European Council
  - (Poland) Donald Tusk
- (European Union) Commission President
  - (Luxembourg) Jean-Claude Juncker
- (European Union) Council Presidency
  - Bulgaria (Jan – Jun 2018)
  - Austria (July – Dec 2018)
- (European Union) Parliament President
  - (Italy) Antonio Tajani
- (European Union) High Representative
  - (Italy) Federica Mogherini

== Events ==
- 1 January: Bulgaria takes over the Presidency of the European Union.
- 1 July: Austria takes over the Presidency of the European Union.

== See also ==
- History of the European Union
- Timeline of European Union history
