= 2014 in the European Union =

- Decades: 1990s; 2000s; 2010s; 2020s
- See also: Other events of 2014; Timeline of EU history

Events in the year 2014 in the European Union.

== Incumbents ==
- (European Union) President of the European Council
  - (Belgium) Herman Van Rompuy (to 30 November 2014)
  - (Poland) Donald Tusk (from 1 December 2014)
- (European Union) Commission President
  - (Belgium) José Manuel Barroso (to 1 November 2014)
  - (Luxembourg) Jean-Claude Juncker (from 1 November 2014)
- (European Union) Council Presidency
  - Greece (Jan – Jun 2014)
  - Italy (July – Dec 2014)
- (European Union) Parliament President
  - (Germany) Martin Schulz
- (European Union) High Representative
  - (United Kingdom) Catherine Ashton (to 1 November 2014)
  - (Italy) Federica Mogherini (from 1 November 2014)

== Events ==
=== January ===
- 1 January
  - Greece takes over the six-month rotating presidency of the Council of the EU. The presidency’s four priorities are growth, jobs and cohesion; further integration of the EU and the euro area; migration, borders and mobility and maritime policies.
  - Latvia adopts the euro as its currency, becoming the 18th member of the euro area.
  - Rīga (Latvia) and Umeå (Sweden) become the 'European Capitals of Culture' for 2014.
- 20 January – EU foreign ministers suspend certain EU sanctions against Iran, following the internationally agreed action plan aimed at addressing concerns about that country's nuclear programme.
- 23 January – Vítor Manuel da Silva Caldeira is re-elected President of the European Court of Auditors for a third three-year term.
- 28 January – At a summit in Brussels, EU and Russian leaders discuss the Eastern Partnership and the fight against terrorism.

=== February ===
- 3 February – The Commission unveils its first anti-corruption report explaining the situation in each Member State.
- 22 February – The President of Ukraine is ousted by the Parliament after several months of popular protest. The country's relationship with the European Union and with Russia is at the heart of a period of uncertainty.

=== March ===
- 17 March – EU foreign ministers strongly condemn the referendum which was held in Crimea, Ukraine, by groups who want the region to become a part of Russia. The EU does not recognise the illegal annexation of Crimea. EU sanctions are imposed against persons in Russia responsible for undermining the territorial integrity of Ukraine.
- 21 March – Meeting in the European Council, EU leaders discuss the crisis in Ukraine and also address economic issues, industrial competitiveness, climate and energy.
- 26 March – At a summit in Brussels, EU leaders and US President Barack Obama discuss international foreign policy, the crisis in Ukraine and key global challenges.

=== April ===
- 15 April – The European Parliament adopts a set of rulebooks on how to deal with banks in serious difficulties, so that taxpayers no longer have to pay for failing banks. This is the final element of the EU’s Banking Union. MEPs also pass a new law guaranteeing EU residents the right to open a basic payment account.
- 28 April – Ahead of this year's European elections, political parties for the first time nominate their candidates for the post of European Commission President, and the candidates engage in 'presidential debates'.

=== May ===
- 22–25 May – European elections take place across the EU and 751 MEPs are elected. Total turnout is 43.09%.
- 25 May – Presidential elections are held in Ukraine amid continued unrest in the eastern part of the country. The winner, Petro Poroshenko, wants to cooperate with the EU.

=== June ===
- 2 June – As part of the 'European Semester', the Commission adopts recommendations for each of the 28 EU countries, offering guidance on 2014-2015 national budgets and economic policies.
- 5 June – The heads of the world's seven leading industrialised countries - the G7 - meet for the first time in Brussels with the EU as host. They discuss the situation in Ukraine, as well as the global economy, energy, climate change and development.
- 20 June – EU finance ministers agree an amendment to EU tax rules to close a loophole which had allowed cross-border corporations to avoid taxes on certain hybrid loan arrangements.
- 26–27 June – EU leaders meet as the European Council sets a strategic agenda for the EU and nominate Jean-Claude Juncker as President-designate of the Commission. They also grant Albania the status of candidate country for future EU membership and confirm that Lithuania will adopt the euro as its currency in 2015. Association agreements between the EU and Georgia, Moldova and Ukraine are signed.

=== July ===
- 1 July
  - Italy takes over the six-month rotating presidency of the Council of the EU.
  - MEPs re-elect German Socialist Martin Schulz as President of the European Parliament for a second two and a half year term.
- 15 July – The European Parliament elects Jean-Claude Juncker as the next President of the European Commission.
- 16 July – EU leaders meet in the European Council to discuss a number of key appointments to be made for top EU positions, as well as relations with Russia and the situation in Gaza.

=== August ===
- 30 August – At a special European Council meeting in Brussels, Donald Tusk, Prime Minister of Poland, is appointed President of the European Council, and Federica Mogherini, the Italian foreign minister, is appointed EU High Representative of the Union for Foreign Affairs and Security Policy.

=== September ===
- 18 September – Residents in Scotland vote "No" in a referendum on Scottish independence from the United Kingdom. The "No" side wins with 55.3% voting against independence. With some exceptions, all EU or Commonwealth citizens resident in Scotland aged 16 or over are eligible to vote.

=== October ===
- 22 October – The European Parliament approves the new college of 27 Commissioners, as presented by its President-elect Jean-Claude Juncker, with 423 votes in favour, 209 against and 67 abstentions.
- 24 October – EU leaders, meeting at the European Council in Brussels, agree to the world's most ambitious climate targets. By 2030 harmful emissions must be reduced by 40% compared to 1990. They also decide to increase EU financial help to €1 billion towards fighting the spread of the Ebola virus in West Africa.

=== November ===
- 1 November
  - New rules enter into force for voting in the Council of Ministers, as stipulated in the Treaty of Lisbon. In order to be adopted by qualified majority, a new law or other decision must now obtain a 'double majority' of both Member States and population. This replaces the former system where each country had an allotted number of votes.
  - The Commission headed by Jean-Claude Juncker takes office.
- 4 November – European Banking Supervision enters into force. The European Central Bank takes on the role of overseeing that banks in the euro area operate in a safe and reliable way, working together with national authorities. This is part of the so-called 'Banking Union', which is meant to prevent the weaknesses in the banking system that precipitated the economic crisis in 2008. On this occasion, the Central Bank publishes a 'stress test' with a detailed analysis of the solidity of the 130 largest banks.
- 26 November – The Commission announces a €315 billion investment plan to get Europe growing again and get more people back to work. Estimates indicate that the measures could create up to 1.3 million new jobs.
- 28 November – The Commission publishes its Annual Growth Survey 2015. This kick-starts the annual ‘European Semester’ for economic policy coordination, which ensures that EU countries align their budgetary and economic plans for growth.

=== December ===
- 1 December – Donald Tusk, former Prime Minister of Poland, replaces Herman Van Rompuy as the President of the European Council.
- 18 December – The European Council backs the creation of a European Fund for Strategic Investments (EFSI) with the aim of mobilising €315 billion in new investments between 2015 and 2017.

== European Capital of Culture ==
The European Capital of Culture is a city designated by the European Union for a period of one calendar year, during which it organises a series of cultural events with a strong European dimension.

- Riga, Latvia
- Umeå, Sweden

== See also ==
- History of the European Union
- Timeline of European Union history
