= Novikombank =

Russian industrial bank

JSCB "NOVIKOMBANK"
- Company type: Joint-Stock Commercial Bank
- Founded: 1993; 33 years ago
- Headquarters: Moscow, Russia
- Key people: Georgieva Elena Aleksandrovna (President)
- Owner: Rostec
- Rating: B2 (Moody's), B− (Fitch) (2017)
- Website: novikom.ru

Novikombank is a Russian bank specializing in financing of enterprises in the heavy-machinery, automotive, high-tech, oil and gas industry. Novikombank is ranked among the top 40 largest Russian banks. Member of the deposit insurance system.

== Ownership ==
At the end of 2008 after the additional issue of shares, AvtoVAZ OJSC joined the bank's shareholders, which in 2011 sold its 20 percent stake to Rostechnologii Group of Companies (formerly Rostec). At the end of May 2014, Rostec acquired 23.63% of the bank's shares. In April 2018, he increased his stake to 74.23%, and on July 26 of the same year, he signed agreements to buy out shares from all remaining shareholders. Thus, the state corporation has collected 100% of Novikombank.

Since March 14, 2016, the Chairman of the Board of Novikombank has been Elena Georgieva, who previously headed the Rostec Treasury since 2013.

== Subsidiaries and associated companies ==
According to the decision of the Bank of Russia Board of Directors in April 2015, Novikombank participates in the financial rehabilitation of OJSC FundServiceBank.

In September 2021, the analytical credit rating agency ACRA upgraded Novikombank's credit rating to A+(RU) (outlook stable).

== Activities ==
Novikombank is one of the banks authorized to work under the state defence order.

"Banking Business" prize winner.

"Most Export Oriented Russian Bank" prize winner in the "Exporter of the Year 2014" competition.

Recapitalization of Novikombank though Federal Loan Obligations (PFZ) in July 2015.

At the end of 2022, Novikombank received a record profit of 19.4 billion rubles. It was decided to allocate 4.9 billion rubles for the payment of dividends.

== Sanctions ==
Sanctioned by New Zealand in relation to the 2022 Russian invasion of Ukraine.

On 24 February 2022, the U.S. Department of the Treasury’s Office of Foreign Assets Control (OFAC) sanctioned Novikombank under E.O. 14024 for operating or having operated in the financial services sector of the Russian Federation economy. Subsidiary companies were also sanctioned. Sanctioned by the US Department of the Treasury.

In December 2023, the United Kingdom subjected the bank to additional sanctions, including a prohibition on correspondent banking relationships on top of an asset freeze.
