= 2019 in the European Union =

- Decades: 1990s; 2000s; 2010s; 2020s
- See also: Other events of 2019; Timeline of EU history

Events of 2019 in the European Union.

== Incumbents ==
- (European Union) President of the European Council
  - (Poland) Donald Tusk (to 30 November 2019)
  - (Belgium) Charles Michel (from 1 December 2019)
- (European Union) Commission President
  - (Luxembourg) Jean-Claude Juncker (to 30 November 2019)
  - (Germany) Ursula von der Leyen (from 1 December 2019)
- (European Union) Council Presidency
  - Romania (Jan – Jun 2019)
  - Finland (July – Dec 2019)
- (European Union) Parliament President
  - (Italy) Antonio Tajani (to 3 July 2019)
  - (Italy) David Sassoli (from 3 July 2019)
- (European Union) High Representative
  - (Italy) Federica Mogherini (to 30 November 2019)
  - (Spain) Josep Borrell (from 1 December 2019)

== Events ==
=== January ===
- January 1 – Romania takes over the Presidency of the Council of the European Union.
- Heavy winter storms paralyzed parts of Scandinavia and the Alps, including northern Norway and Sweden, southern Germany, and Austria.
- European border agency Frontex estimated 150,000 people entered the EU through irregular crossings in 2018, a 92% drop from the peak recorded in 2015, mainly due to a dramatic drop in arrivals from Libya, Algeria, and Tunisia using the central Mediterranean route through Italy.

=== March ===
- March 13 – the European Parliament unanimously accepted the call for a halt to the full membership negotiations between the EU and Turkey.
- March 26 – The European Parliament votes by 348 to 278 in favour of the controversial Article 13 of the EU Directive on Copyright in the Digital Single Market, which expands legal liability for websites.

=== July ===
- July 1 – Finland takes over the Presidency of the Council of the European Union.

=== October ===
- October 10 – Turkish president Recep Tayyip Erdoğan threatens to send the millions of refugees in Turkey to EU member states, over criticism of its Syria offensive.

=== November ===
- November 10 – The Latvian Green Party is expelled from the European Green Party for its Social conservatism.
