= 1972 in the European Communities =

The signing of the treaties of accession by Denmark, United Kingdom, Republic of Ireland and Norway occurred on 22 January. While Norwegian voters later in the year rejected the treaty in a referendum later that year, the three other states joined the EC on 1 January 1973.
