= History of the European Communities (1958–1972) =

The history of the European Communities between 1958 and 1972 saw the early development of the European Communities. The European Coal and Steel Community (ECSC) had just been joined by the European Atomic Energy Community (Euratom) and the European Economic Community (EEC), the latter of which soon became the most important. In 1967 the EEC's institutions took over the other two with the EEC's Commission holding its first terms under Hallstein and Rey.

In 1958 the Committee of Permanent Representatives (COREPER) was established. On 19 March the Parliamentary Assembly (replacing the Common Assembly) met for the first time for all three communities and elected Robert Schuman as its President. On 13 May members sat according to political, rather than national, allegiance for the first time.

Enlargement, 1957 to 2013 Community enlargement Since 1995

== The European Free Trade Association and the EEC ==
In 1960, the "outer seven" (Austria, Denmark, Norway, Portugal, Sweden, Switzerland and the United Kingdom) established the European Free Trade Association in Stockholm, which entered into force on 3 May of that year. In the following two years, the United Kingdom, Ireland, Denmark and Norway applied for membership of the Communities, while the neutral countries Austria, Sweden and Switzerland asked for economic association agreements. Membership application was suspended due to opposition from then-French President Charles de Gaulle to British membership, seeing it as a Trojan horse for US influence.

Another crisis was triggered in regard to proposals for the financing of the Common Agricultural Policy, which came into force in 1962. The transitional period whereby decisions were made by unanimity had come to an end, and majority-voting in the council had taken effect. De Gaulle's opposition to supranationalism and fear of the other members challenging the CAP led to an "empty chair policy" whereby French representatives were withdrawn from the European institutions until the French veto was reinstated. Eventually, a compromise was reached with the Luxembourg compromise on 29 January 1966 whereby a gentlemen's agreement permitted members to use a veto on areas of national interest.

== Merger Treaty ==
On 24 September 1963 the members reached an agreement on merging the executive bodies of the three Communities. A year later it is agreed the single "Commission" would have nine members: two from each of the larger states, France, Germany and Italy, and one from each of the smaller Benelux states: Belgium, Netherlands and Luxembourg.

The Merger Treaty was signed on 8 April 1965 and entered into force on 1 July 1967 merging all three Communities with common institutions. The head of the first Commission was Jean Rey, appointed on 6 July of the same year (Rey Commission).

== First enlargement ==
The thorns encountered with the 1964 Spanish Question on accession and the Regime of the Colonels in Greece from April 1967 caused some consternation and introspection in the Community ranks, and the UK resubmitted its application on 11 May 1967. In 1969 a change in the French Presidency to Georges Pompidou prompted a shift, with France opening up to British accession. Negotiations began on 30 June 1970, in Britain this was under the Conservative government of Edward Heath. His pro-European administration had to deal with problems relating to the Common Agricultural Policy and the UK's relationship with the Commonwealth of Nations. It also had to accept all decisions taken since the Merger Treaty. Negotiations took two years with the signing of accession treaties on 22 January 1972. Britain did not hold a referendum before joining; the results of the other three were as follows;

- Ireland – 83.1% in favour (10 May) (see also: Third Amendment of the Constitution of Ireland)
- Norway – 46.5% in favour (25 September)
- Denmark – 63.3% in favour (2 October)

Norway failed to ratify with 53.5% against; they would try again in the years to come but on 1 January 1973, only the three remaining countries acceded.

== See also ==
- Malfatti Commission
- Mansholt Commission
- Bretton Woods system
- Munich massacre
- Fouchet Plan
