= Outline of the European Union =

The Flag of Europe

The location of the European Union

The following outline is provided as an overview of and topical guide to the European Union:

The European Union (EU) is an economic and political union of 27 member states, located primarily in Europe. Committed to regional integration, the EU was established by the Treaty of Maastricht on 1 November 1993 upon the foundations of the pre-existing European Economic Community. With about 445 million citizens, the EU generates an estimated 30% share (US$18.4 trillion in 2008) of the nominal gross world product. The EU has seven principal decision-making bodies known as the Institutions of the European Union, while the adoption of laws and coordination of EU policies is the role of the Council of the European Union which currently meets in ten different configurations.

== Origins ==
- History of the European Union
  - Ideas of European unity before 1945
  - History of the European Coal and Steel Community (1945–57)
  - History of the European Communities (1958–72)
  - History of the European Communities (1973–93)
  - History of the European Union (1993–2004)
  - History of the European Union since 2004
- Location of the EU and its special territories
  European Communities
  - European Economic Community
  - European Coal and Steel Community
  - European Atomic Energy Community
- Single market, Trade bloc and Value-added tax
- Subsidiarity
- See treaties below

== Identity ==
- Symbols of Europe, symbols of the European Union
  - Flag of Europe
  - Anthem of Europe
  - Europe Day

== Structures ==
Map showing the Member States of the European Union (clickable)

1. Members
  - Member states
    - Dependent Territories of Member States
  - Enlargement
  - Withdrawal
2. Institutions
  - European Commission
  - European Parliament
  - Council of the European Union
  - Court of Justice of the European Union
  - European Court of Auditors
  - European Central Bank
  - European Council
3. Other bodies
  - European Committee of the Regions
  - European Economic and Social Committee
  - European System of Central Banks
  - European Investment Bank
  - European Investment Fund
  - Agencies of the European Union
  - European Ombudsman
  - European External Action Service
4. Related Organisations
  - European Free Trade Association
  - European Economic Area
  - Western European Union (1954-2011)

== Law and policy ==
1. Treaties of the European Union – Founding and amending treaties (primary legislation)
  - Treaty of Paris (1951)
  - Treaty of Rome (1957)
  - Merger Treaty (1965)
  - Single European Act (1986)
  - Maastricht Treaty (1992)
  - Amsterdam Treaty (1997)
  - Treaty of Nice (2001)
  - Treaty of Accession 2003
  - Treaty of Accession 2005
  - Treaty of Lisbon (2007)
  - Treaty of Accession 2011
  - Related documents
    - Schengen Agreement
    - Treaty establishing a Constitution for Europe
    - Charter of Fundamental Rights of the European Union
2. EU Policy Areas
  - Economic and Monetary Union of the European Union (Euro)
  - European Political Cooperation
  - Common Agricultural Policy
  - Common Fisheries Policy
  - Regional policy of the European Union
  - Trans-European Networks
  - Energy
3. European Union law
  - Acquis communautaire
  - Official Journal of the European Union
  - EU competition law (see also Antitrust, Cartel, Economics, Microeconomics, Perfect competition, Industrial organization, Game theory)
4. Forms of Secondary Legislation
  - Directive
  - Regulation
  - Recommendation
5. Topics of Secondary Legislation
  - Copyright law of the European Union
6. Directives and Regulations of Secondary Legislation:
  - Societas Europaea
  - Protected designation of origin
  - Unitary patent
  - Registration, Evaluation, Authorisation and Restriction of Chemicals
  - Directive on the enforcement of intellectual property rights
  - Directive 95/46/EC on the protection of personal data
  - Directive on harmonising the term of copyright protection

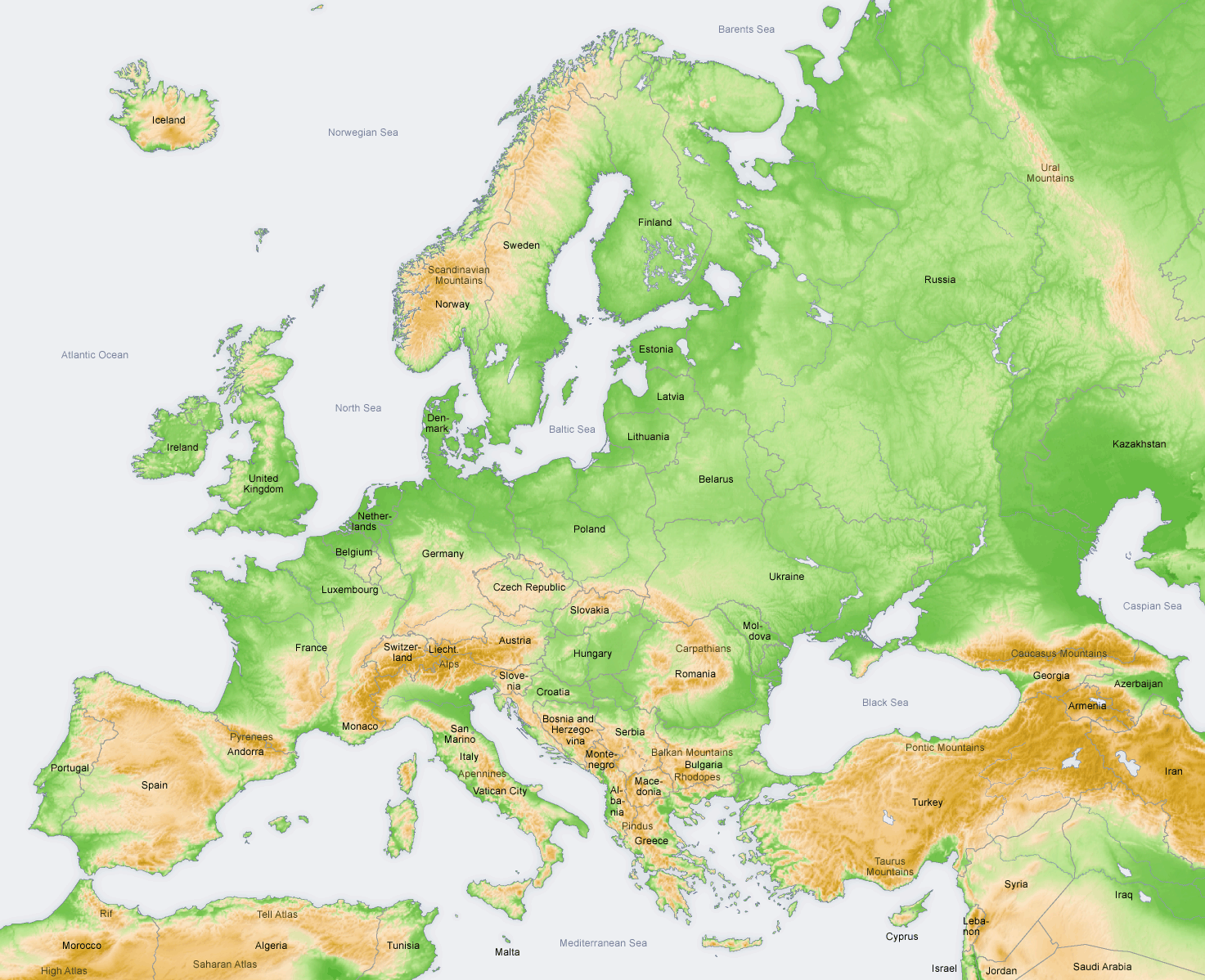
A topographic map of Europe

== Miscellaneous ==
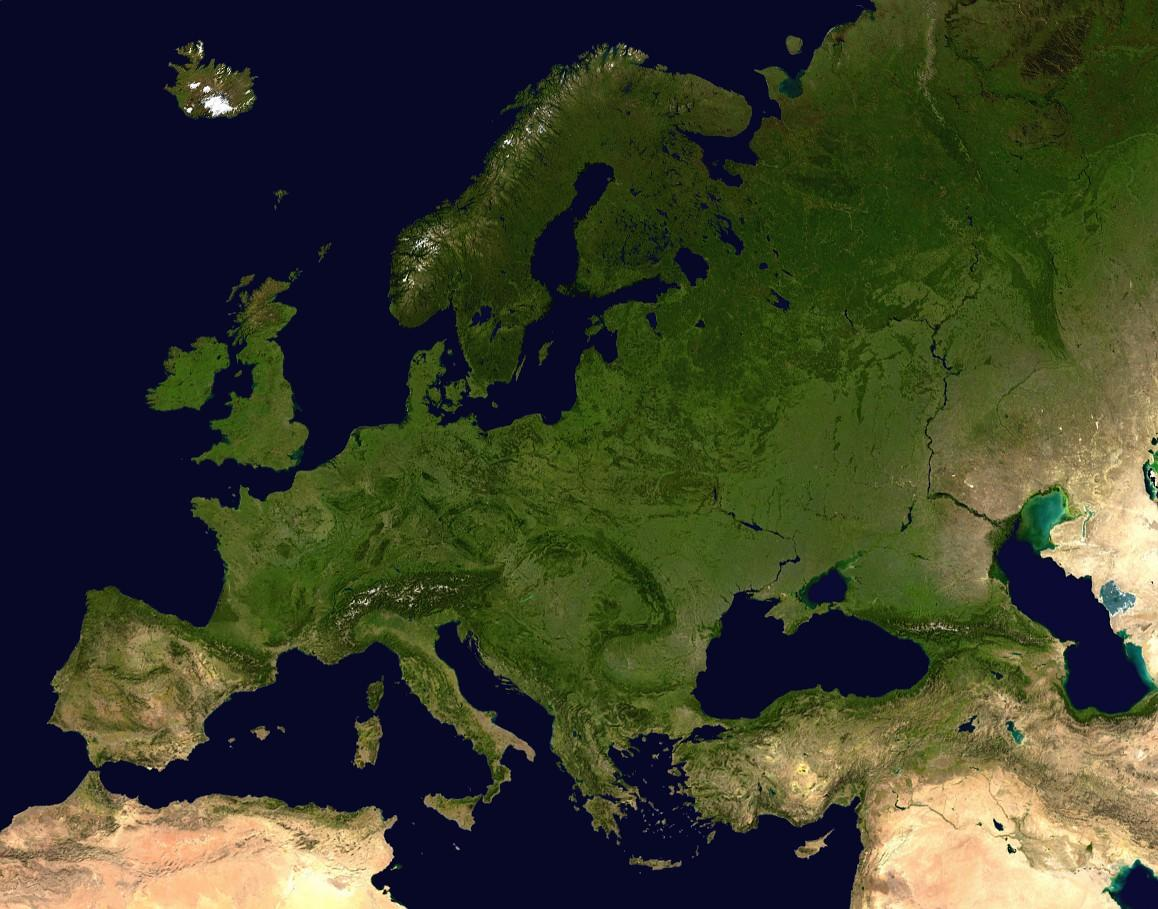
A satellite composite image of Europe

- Economy of the European Union
- European Neighbourhood Policy
- European Union statistics
- Euroscepticism, Europhobe
- European Union Association Agreement
- Pro-Europeanism, Europhiles
- List of cities in the European Union by population within city limits
- Morocco–European Union relations
- Sport policies of the European Union
- United States of Europe
- Trade war
  - Trade war over genetically modified food
- Statewatch
- Supranational union

== See also ==
European Union

- G20
- Outline of Europe
- Outline of Austria
- Outline of Belgium
- Outline of Bulgaria
- Outline of Croatia
- Outline of Cyprus
- Outline of the Czech Republic
- Outline of Denmark
- Outline of Estonia
- Outline of Finland
- Outline of France
- Outline of Germany
- Outline of Greece
- Outline of Hungary
- Outline of the Republic of Ireland
- Outline of Italy
- Outline of Latvia
- Outline of Lithuania
- Outline of Luxembourg
- Outline of Malta
- Outline of the Netherlands
- Outline of Poland
- Outline of Portugal
- Outline of Romania
- Outline of Slovakia
- Outline of Slovenia
- Outline of Spain
- Outline of Sweden
