= History of the European Communities (1973–1993) =

Between 1973 and 1993 the European Communities saw the first enlargement of the Communities. On 1 January 1973, Denmark, Ireland, and the United Kingdom became the first countries to join the Communities. The détente allowed initiation of the reunification of the continent through establishing the Conference on Security and Co-operation in Europe. Greece was the next to join EC on 1 January 1981, followed by Spain and Portugal joining on 1 January 1986, while Turkey has initiated the procedure in 1987. Upon the fall of the Iron Curtain, the CSCE was transformed in 1990 into Organization for Security and Co-operation in Europe, the Communities enlarged for a fourth time through the German reunification, while other former communist European countries stated their firm commitment to join, prompting formulation of the Copenhagen criteria. This period was, however, also the one which witnessed the first voluntary exit from the Communities, namely the one of Greenland in 1985. The integration progressed under the Delors Commission resulting in the creation of the European Union in 1993.

== Politics ==
=== Commission ===
==== Ortoli Commission ====
The Ortoli Commission under François-Xavier Ortoli assumed its office in the newly enlarged European Communities on 5 January 1973.

==== Jenkins Commission ====
The first Commission to be led by a member from the new states was the Jenkins Commission, of the UK's Roy Jenkins who held office between 1977 and 1981. Following on was the Thorn Commission, which oversaw the completion of the customs union and then 1985 saw the first Delors Commission.

==== Delors era ====
Jacques Delors' Commission, serving from 1985 to 1994, is regarded as the most successful in history, becoming a frequent source of comparison to his successors.

Delors presided over accession of Spain and Portugal, the fall of Communism with the reunification of Germany in 1990, the adoption of the European flag, the Single European Act, the Maastricht Treaty, the beginnings of EMU, the signing of the Schengen Agreement (19 June 1990) and the completion of the single market.

=== Parliament ===
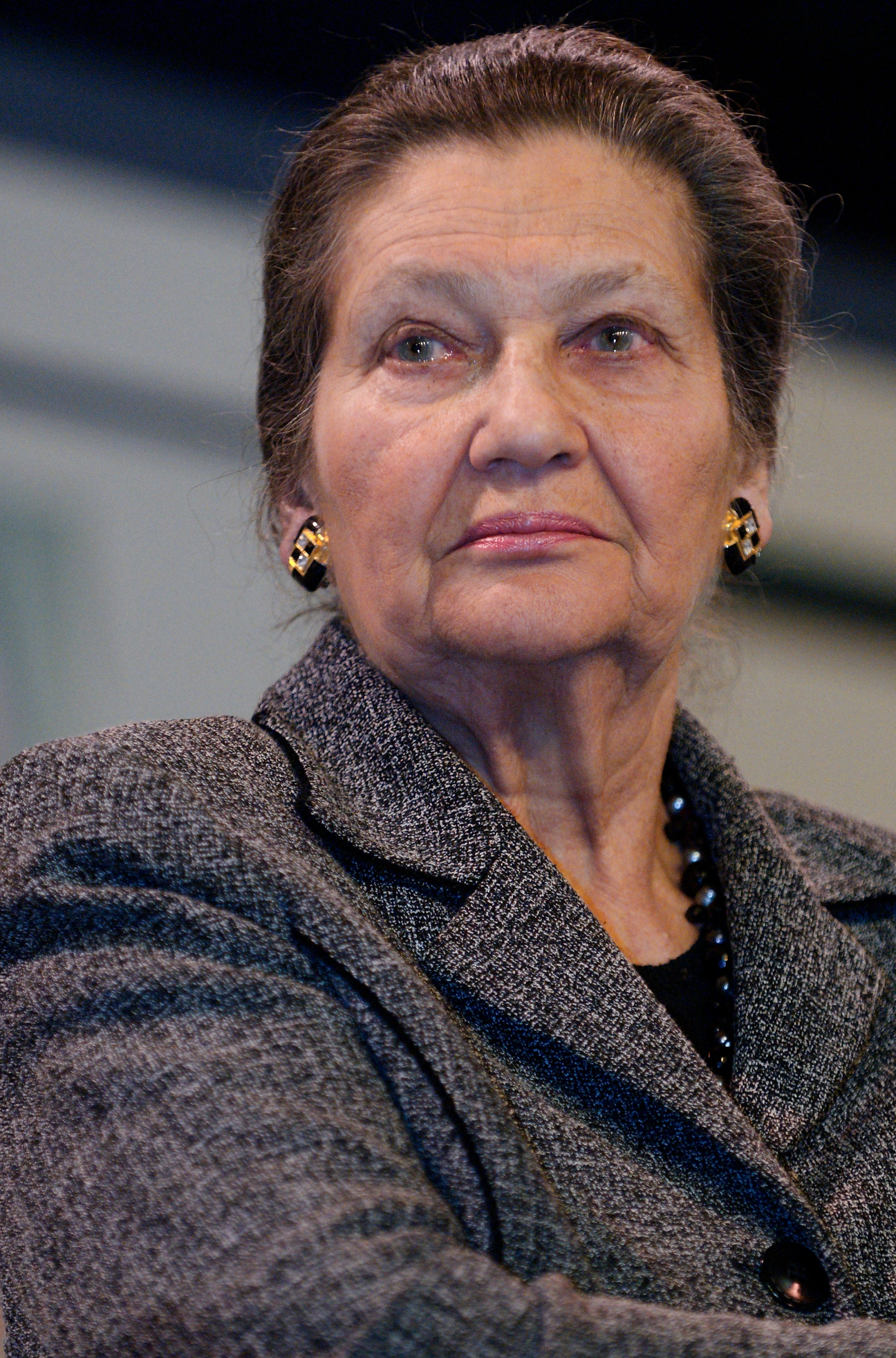
Simone Veil, elected the first female President of Parliament

The Treaties of Rome had stated that the European Parliament must be directly elected, however this required the Council to agree on a common voting system first. The Council procrastinated on the issue and the Parliament remained appointed, French President Charles de Gaulle was particularly active in blocking the development of the Parliament, preventing it from acquiring budgetary powers until his departure from office.

Parliament pressured for agreement and on 20 September 1976 the Council agreed part of the necessary instruments for election, deferring details on electoral systems which remain varied to this day. During the tenure of President Jenkins, in June 1979, the elections were held in all the then-members. 410 MEPs were elected and at their first meeting they elected a new President of the European Parliament; Simone Veil, a French liberal who was the first woman to be elected to the post.

The new Parliament, galvanised by direct election and new powers, started working full-time and became more active than the previous assemblies. The elections also helped cement the political groups and, despite attempts by the larger groups to consolidate their position, smaller parties began to co-operate and form alliances. In the subsequent elections (1984 and 1989) the electorate expanded to include new member states and the left wing parties saw increasing electoral gains. However, turnout began to drop from 63% in 1979 to 58% in 1989.

=== Intergovernmental ===
The Single European Act was signed by the foreign ministers on 17 and 28 February 1986 in Luxembourg and The Hague respectively. In a single document it dealt with reform of institutions, extension of powers, foreign policy cooperation and the single market. It came into force on 1 July 1987.

The act was influenced by work on what would be the Maastricht Treaty, the Treaty establishing the European Union. There had previously been plans to create a more integrated body and, spurred on by enlargement, various groups put forward plans. Building on the legitimacy of its elections, in 1984 the Parliament produced the Spinelli plan. The draft treaty establishing a European Union, which was inspired by the failed European Political Community, was adopted by the Parliament 237 votes to 31 (43 abstentions). It would have given a more federal structure using the community method and codecision with the parliament, however it failed to win the support of the member states. (See also: Crocodile Club)

Similar proposals from the Commission collapsed due to arguments over the UK rebate (secured by British Prime Minister Margaret Thatcher in 1984) and a German-Italian proposal resulted in the Solemn Declaration on European Union of 19 June 1983 as a political impetus towards a Union but not itself a binding treaty. A treaty establishing the European Union was eventually agreed on 10 December 1991 and signed on 7 February of the following year. Denmark lost a referendum on ratification but succeeded in a second attempt after securing four opt-outs. The Treaty came into force on 1 November 1993.

== Expansion and contraction ==
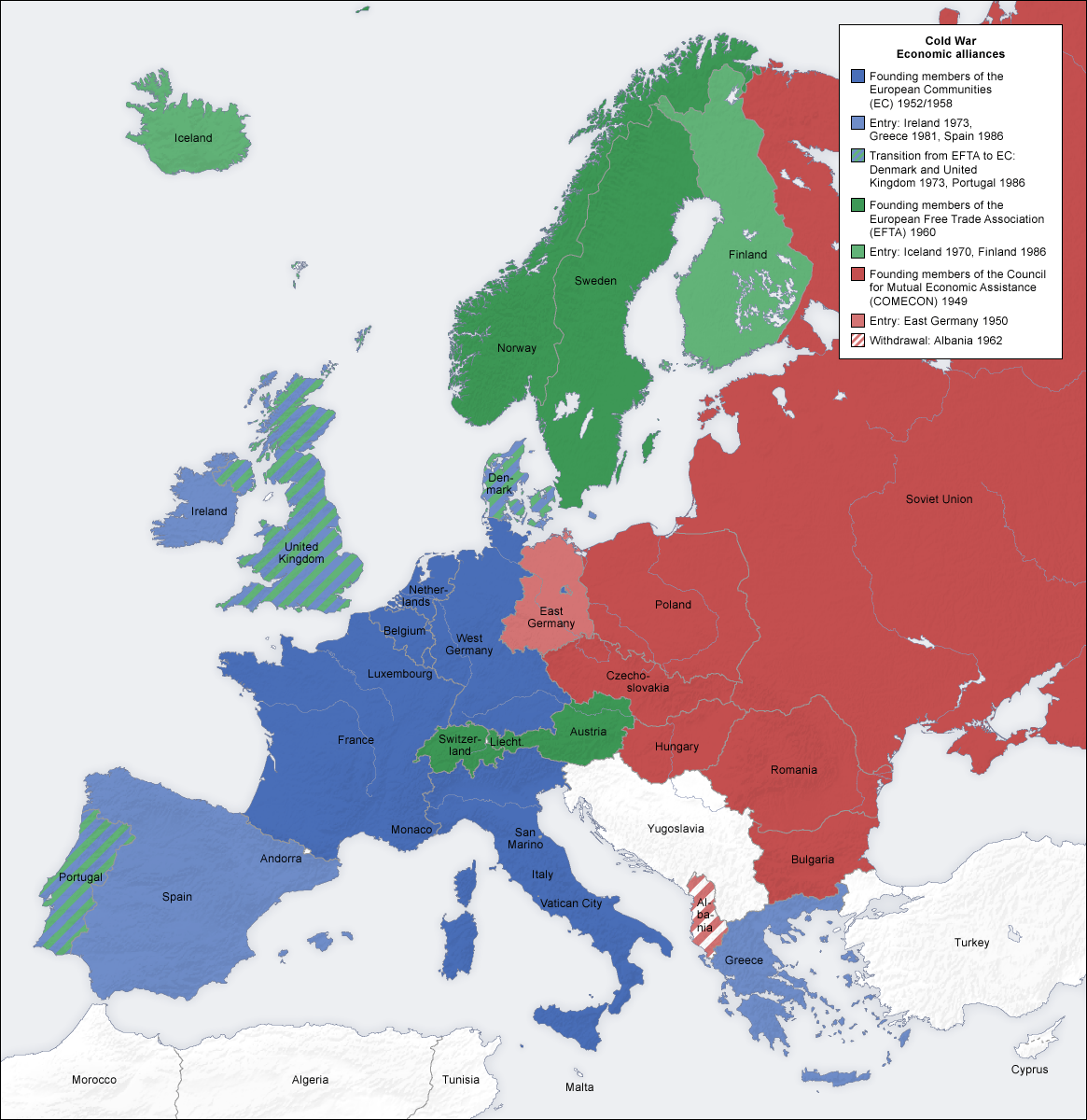
The Communities alongside the European Free Trade Association and Comecon during the Cold War. The EC would enlarge to include most of the members of the latter two.

1973–1986 EC enlargements

existing members
new members in 1973
Denmark
Ireland
United Kingdom

existing members
new members in 1981
Greece

existing members
new members in 1986
Portugal
Spain

Greece, already an associate member (the first) since 1961, applied to join the community on 12 June 1975 following the restoration of democracy. It joined on 1 January 1981. In 1985, after gaining home rule from Denmark, Greenland left the community following a referendum but remained an overseas territory. Following on from Greece, and after their own democratic restoration, Spain and Portugal applied to the communities in 1977. They joined together on 1 January 1986. In 1987 Turkey formally applied to join the Community and had begun the longest application process for any country.

=== End of the Eastern Bloc ===
The Ostpolitik and the ensuing détente led in 1975 to establishment of a first truly pan-European body, the Conference on Security and Co-operation in Europe (CSCE). Following the fall of the Iron Curtain, the CSCE was transformed in 1990 into the modern Organization for Security and Co-operation in Europe, while the Communities expanded once more as a result of German reunification.

As the main obstacle for the countries of the former Eastern Bloc to participate in the European integration was removed, first of them started to express openly their aspirations to join the Communities. In response leaders gathered in Copenhagen on 22 June 1993 to define entry conditions for candidate states. These criteria were later included in the Maastricht Treaty. The following is an excerpt from the criteria;

"Membership requires that the candidate country has achieved stability of institutions guaranteeing democracy, the rule of law, human rights and respect for and, protection of minorities, the existence of a functioning market economy as well as the capacity to cope with competitive pressure and market forces within the Union. Membership presupposes the candidate's ability to take on the obligations of membership including adherence to the aims of political, economic and monetary union."

== See also ==
- Eurosclerosis
- Concorde
- Solidarity
- Berlin Wall
- Common European Home
- European Economic Community

== Sources ==
- Source of majority of the dates: A growing community – more countries join and the changing face of Europe – the fall of the Berlin Wall
