= History of the European Union (2004–present) =

The history of the European Union from 2004 to the present is the current timeline of the European Union. It is a period of significant upheaval and reform following the 2004 enlargement of the European Union. The EU has taken on ten new members, eight of which were initially much poorer than the EU average, and took in a further two in 2007 with many more on the way. It created the euro a few years before and had to expand this, and the Schengen Area to its new members. However this was overshadowed by the late-2000s recession and damaging disputes over the European Constitution and its successor, the Treaty of Lisbon. Throughout this period, the European People's Party has been the largest group in the European Parliament and provides every President of the European Commission.

== Parliament and Commission ==
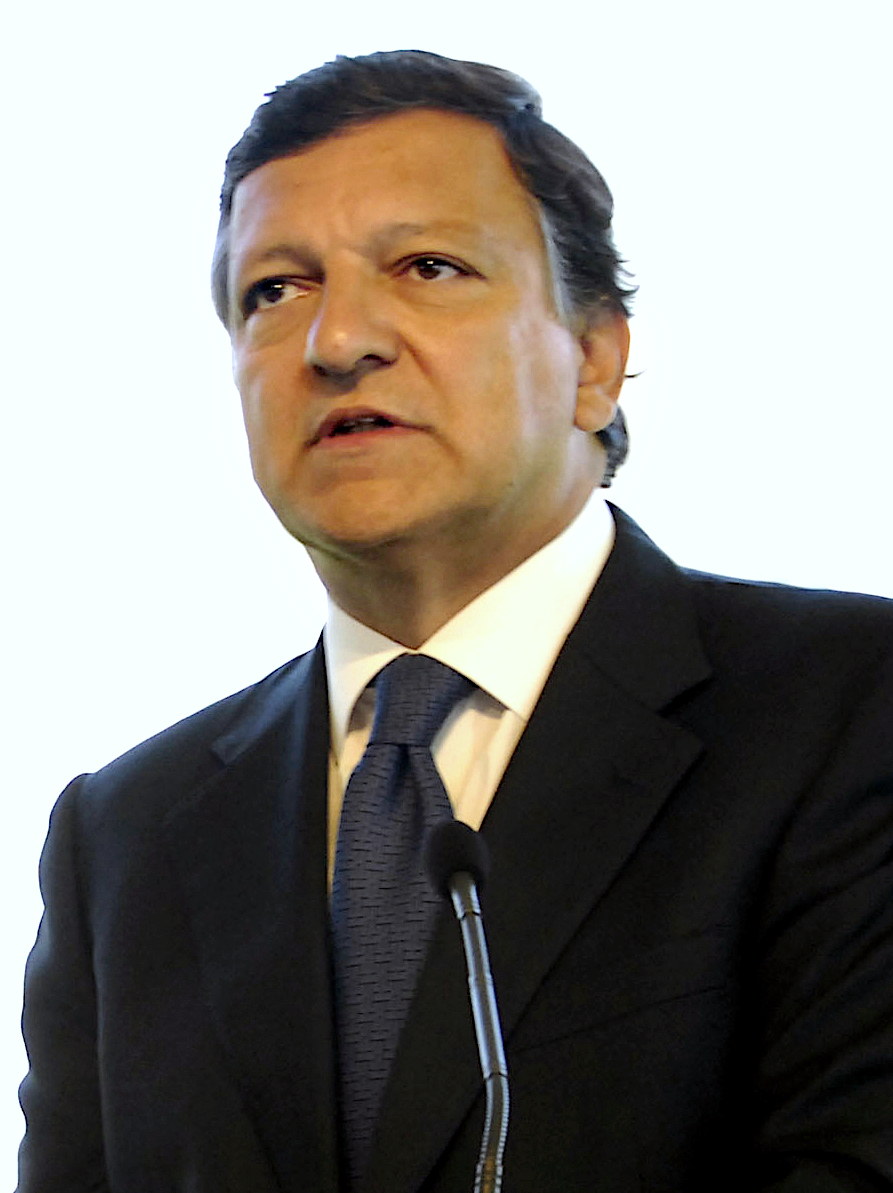
President Barroso

During 10–13 June 2004, the 25 member states participated in the largest trans-national election in history (with the second largest democratic electorate in the world). The result of the sixth Parliamentary election was a second victory for the European People's Party-European Democrats group. It also saw the lowest voter turnout of 45.5%, the second time it had fallen below 50%.

=== Barroso I ===
The Prodi Commission was due to end its mandate at the end of October 2004, so following the 2004 elections to the Sixth European Parliament, candidates for Commission President began to be considered. There was strong backing for Belgian Prime Minister Guy Verhofstadt (EDLR) from Republic of Ireland, France and Germany who saw him as a "convinced European and also a fighter". However the federalist was opposed by Spain the United Kingdom, Italy and Poland due to his vocal opposition to the Iraq War and the inclusion of God in the European Constitution. Irish Taoiseach Bertie Ahern (AEN) was also a popular candidate but did not wish to take up the job.

Due to the victory of the European People's Party in the previous election, EPP parties were keen to get one of their members into the post, including Luxembourgian Prime Minister Jean-Claude Juncker (EPP), who refused, and Austrian Chancellor Wolfgang Schüssel (EPP), who was in a coalition with a right wing party which discredited him as a candidate to some governments. A number of Commissioners were also touted, notably Franz Fischler, Commissioner for Agriculture (Austria, EPP), António Vitorino, Commissioner for JHA (Portugal, PES), Chris Patten, Commissioner for External Relations (UK, ED), Michel Barnier, and Commissioner for Regional Policy (France, EPP).

Other candidates were High Representative Javier Solana (Spain, PES) and President of the Parliament Pat Cox (Ireland, ELDR) however both were light candidates. However Barroso emerged as a leading candidate despite his support for the Iraq War and being seen as the lowest common denominator following objections to other candidates. The Parliament approved Barroso as president on 22 July 2004 by 413 votes to 215 (44 abstentions) with most of his support coming from the EPP-ED group. He did however earn praise for his later choice of candidates.

During the hearings, members found fault in a number of Commissioners. Committees questioned the suitability of Ingrida Udre (Taxation and Customs Union), László Kovács (Energy), Neelie Kroes (Competition) and Mariann Fischer-Boel (Agriculture). However the most controversial was Rocco Buttiglione as European Commissioner for Justice, Freedom and Security due to his conservative comments (on women's position in marriage and that homosexuality was a sin) which, in the eyes of some MEPs, made him unsuitable for a job securing civil rights in the EU leading to the civil rights committee to be the first committee to vote down an incoming Commissioner.

The Socialists were the most vocal critics of Barroso and his proposed Commission, while the People's Party backed the commission with the liberals split. Barroso attempted to offer small concessions to Parliament but they were not accepted as the Socialists made clear they would vote down the commission as it stood, leaving the divided liberals holding the balance of whether the Barroso Commission would be the first Commission in EU history to rejected by Parliament. The People's Party demanded that if Buttiglione were to go, then a Socialist commissioner must also be sacrificed for balance.

Barroso eventually gave in and withdrew his proposed college of Commissioners and, following three weeks which left Prodi continuing as a caretaker, proposed a new line-up. There were three changes to help his dented authority and win the support of Parliament: Buttiglione had been withdrawn by Italy and replaced by foreign minister Franco Frattini, László Kovács was moved from Energy to Taxation and Ingrida Udre was withdrawn and replaced by Andris Piebalgs who took over the now vacant post of Energy. The commission was approved on 18 November 2004, 449 votes in favour, 149 against and 82 abstentions, after Barroso gained the support of all three major parties and they took office on 22 November, three weeks after they were due to.

=== 2007 ===
Bulgaria and Romania joined the EU on 1 January 2007 with each being granted a single Commissioner, increasing the college of Commissioners to 27 members. Both new Commissioners were approved by the Parliament on 12 December 2006. Meglena Kuneva was proposed by Bulgaria and was assigned the Consumer Protection portfolio, previously part of the joint Health & Consumer Protection portfolio. She was welcomed by Parliament with the People's Party and Socialists being impressed by her aims and attitude. Kuneva had 583 votes "in favour", 21 votes "against" and 28 votes "abstentions".

Romania originally proposed Senator Varujan Vosganian, however he quickly met with opposition from Socialists and the Commission itself due to his far right views and having no experience of the EU or profile outside Romania. That nomination was replaced by Leonard Orban who was given the portfolio of Multilingualism, previously part of Education, Training & Culture. This however was met a cool reception for being such a slim portfolio. Socialist leader Martin Schulz MEP suggested it should instead focus on ethnic minorities but this was rejected by Barroso. Orban was approved by Parliament with 595 votes in favour, 16 against and 29 abstentions.

=== Barroso II ===
The 2009 elections again saw a victory for the European People's Party, despite losing the British Conservatives who formed a smaller eurosceptic grouping with other anti-federalist right wing parties. Parliament's presidency was once again divided between the People's Party and the Socialists, with Jerzy Buzek elected as the first eastern European to become President of the European Parliament.

In 2008, Barroso had steadily won support from leaders for a second term as president, Nicolas Sarkozy and Silvio Berlusconi both declared their support for Barroso, though Barroso himself stated it is up to the political parties in Parliament. On 19 July 2008 Barroso stated for the first time that he was seeking a second term and was backed by the EPP for re-election.

In the 2009 elections, the EPP maintained their position as largest party, though without an absolute majority even with the support of other parties to their right. Yet the second and third largest groups, the Socialists and the Liberals, failed to put forward an alternative candidate to challenge Barroso even if they had won. Despite this, a loose red-green-yellow coalition (the Socialists and Liberals with the Greens–European Free Alliance) formed against him in an attempt to gain concessions from Barroso. They demanded Barroso set out clearly his policy guidelines for his next term and offer key posts in the commission to their group members. They also attempted to push the vote back beyond the ratification date for the Treaty of Lisbon to have more power over his appointment.

In a meeting with the political groups on 10 September 2009, Barroso argued his new policies to a packed room with an unusually lively debate as Barroso defended his record against the Greens, his most ardent opponents. Despite holding his own in the debate he did not win support from the Greens. however the Socialist and Liberal leaders softened their opposition, the latter approving of the idea of a Commissioner for Human Rights. Following the plenary debate on 15 September the People's Party and anti-federalist Conservatives and Reformists declared support, with conditional support from the Liberals. The Socialists, Greens and eurosceptic Freedom and Democracy group all declared opposition, criticising the liberals for switching camps. However the groups struggled to enforce a party line as MEPs vote via a secret ballot. The vote took place on 16 September 2009. On 16 September 2009, Barroso was re-elected by Parliament by 382 to 219 (out of 718, with 117 abstentions).

Bulgaria's initial Commission candidate, Rumiana Jeleva, was forced to step down due to opposition from MEPs, mainly the Socialists, who questioned her suitability and financial interests despite backing from the People's Party (to which her national party belongs). Bulgaria rapidly submitted Kristalina Georgieva but this forced the vote on the commission to be delayed weeks so Georgieva's hearings could be arranged. The only other commissioner-designate to lack support was returning commissioner Neelie Kroes, who was also seen to perform poorly in her hearing. However, she was invited back and secured more support, indicating she will get approval from Parliament.

Parliament approved the new line-up on 9 February 2010 with 488 votes in favour. 137, the greens and far left, voted against while 72 MEPs abstained; including the conservative and reformists who abstained on democracy grounds. The greens criticised the other parties for opposing Barroso's team and then voting in favour anyway, protesting that Barroso "assigned portfolios without respect to the prospective commissioners' competences. Worse still, he moved commissioners from posts where they were doing a good job. The new college risks being characterised by internal power struggles instead of teamwork due to the unclear division of responsibilities." while the conservatives desired a vote for them individually as "there were strong candidates who we would have endorsed, and weak candidates who we would have opposed."

=== Juncker ===
Jean-Claude Juncker was Prime Minister of Luxembourg from 1995 to 2013, and later was appointed President of the European Commission, officially taking office on 1 November 2014 to succeed José Manuel Barroso. His term lasted five years until December 2019. The most important challenges he faced during his term were the Russian-backed conflict in Ukraine, his 2016 push to create European security union following a series of terrorist attacks in Europe, and the Brexit issue.

=== Von der Leyen ===
In July 2019, the European Council appointed German Defense Minister Ursula von der Leyen as President of the European Commission, making her the first women to hold this position. When her first term ended, her mandate was renewed for a second five-year term. Her presidency witnessed several crises, the most important of witch were the Covid-19, the Russian-Ukrainian conflict and the climate crisis.

== Institutional reform ==
=== Constitution ===
Ratifications in member states and candidate countries Yes – Accession treaty Yes – Parliament only Yes – Referendum No – Referendum Referendum postponed indefinitely No referendum was proposed

In 2003 the Treaty of Nice came into force, which prepared the EU for its 2004 enlargement. However some thought further reform was needed and even before Nice came into force the European Convention, chaired by former French president Valéry Giscard d'Estaing, set out to draft a European Constitution which would consolidate all existing treaties and simplify the workings of the EU. The draft was backed by the Commission and in June 2004 the final text was settled. On 29 October 2004, the European Constitution was signed by EU leaders in Rome.

The constitution proposed a number of changes. Although its powers were not extended, more decisions would be taken by majority voting and involve the Parliament. It did this by abolishing the pillar structure of the EU. It also sought to simplify the structure and add more coherence by creating a permanent President of the European Council, rather than have it rotate between members, and merge the High Representative with the European Commissioner for External Relations to provide a single diplomatic representation. It also included articles regarding the EU flag and anthem (for detail of the changes, see Treaty establishing a Constitution for Europe#Content).

==== Rejection ====
The treaty was put to ratification in each member state. Every state had to approve it before it could come into force. In most, this was done by a Parliamentary vote (referendums are banned in Germany) but in others, it was put to a referendum. Spain was the first country to hold a referendum on the Constitution. The referendum approved the Constitution by 76% of the votes, although participation was only around 43%. On 29 May 2005 the French public rejected the Constitution by margin of 55% to 45% on a turn out of 69%. And just three days later the Dutch rejected the constitution by a margin of 61% to 39% on a turnout of 62%. Notwithstanding the rejection in France and the Netherlands, Luxembourg held a referendum on 10 July 2005 approving the Constitution by 57% to 43%. It was the last referendum to be held on the Constitution as all of the other member states that had proposed to hold referendums cancelled them.

Following the constitution's rejection by such central states, the EU leaders declared a "period of reflection" while they decided what to do next. This period ending with the Berlin Declaration on 25 March 2007 (which was the 50th anniversary of the Treaties of Rome). The declaration was intended to give a new impetus to finding a new institutional settlement. On 4 June 2007, this group, known as the Amato Group, presented its report. They proposed to establish a new Inter-Governmental Conference with a view to writing a new treaty which would rewrite the Treaty on European Union, amend the Treaty establishing the European Community and give the Charter of Fundamental Rights of the European Union a legally binding status. The new treaty would be based on the first and fourth parts of the Constitution, the rest of the Constitution's changes being achieved through amendments to the Treaty of Rome.

=== Lisbon ===
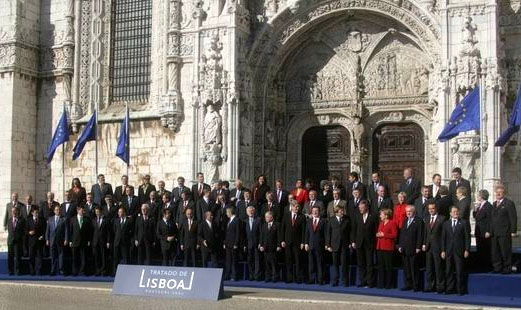
The Treaty of Lisbon entered into force on 1 December.

Agreement was reached on a 16-page mandate for an Intergovernmental Conference, that proposed removing much of the constitutional terminology and many of the symbols from the old European Constitution text. In addition it was agreed to recommend to the IGC that the provisions of the old European Constitution should be amended in certain key aspects (such as voting or foreign policy). Due to pressure from the United Kingdom and Poland, it was also decided to add a protocol to the Charter of Fundamental Rights of the European Union (clarifying that it did not extend the rights of the courts to overturn domestic law in Britain or Poland). Among the specific changes were greater ability to opt out in certain areas of legislation and that the proposed new voting system that was part of the European Constitution would not be used before 2014 (see Provisions below). In the June meeting, the name 'Reform Treaty' also emerged, finally clarifying that the Constitutional approach was abandoned. Technically it was agreed that the Reform Treaty would amend both the Treaty on European Union (TEU) and the Treaty establishing the European Community (TEC) to include most provisions of the European Constitution, however not to combine them into one document. It was also agreed to rename the Treaty establishing the European Community, which is the main functional agreement including most of the substantive provisions of European primary law, to "Treaty on the Functioning of the Union". In addition it was agreed, that unlike the European Constitution where a Charter was part of the document, there would only be a reference to the Charter of Fundamental Rights of the European Union to make that text legally binding.

The signing of the Treaty of Lisbon took place in Lisbon, Portugal on 13 December 2007. This treaty however was designed so it would not be necessary it put it to referendums. However Republic of Ireland was required by its constitution to hold a referendum. In 2008 the referendum was lost, setting back the treaty's implementation. However, after a series of guarantees was given to Ireland, the Irish reversed their decision in a second referendum in 2009.

The Lisbon Treaty finally came into force on 1 December 2009. It created the post of President of the European Council and significantly expanded the post of High Representative. After much debate about what kind of person should be president, the European Council agreed on a low-key personality and chose Herman Van Rompuy while foreign policy-novice Catherine Ashton became High Representative. Ashton was given the task of drawing up the plan for the new European External Action Service (EEAS) and soon received criticism on her abilities, her diplomatic decisions and her plans for the EEAS though many dismissed these criticisms as unwarranted. Finally, with the financial crisis, there developed a new impetus for reform of the eurozone governance (see below).

Lisbon also abolished the pillar system, extending parliamentary oversight to the areas formerly under Police and Judicial Co-operation in Criminal Matters and to a limited extent the Common Foreign and Security Policy. Despite not having total control over that area, Parliament did have budgetary powers over the setting up of the EEAS and held it hostage until its demands on the EEAS were met. Extension of the EU's role in defence and oversight on it also led to the decision on 31 March 2010 to abolish the Western European Union.

== Membership changes ==
=== Enlargement ===
2007–2013 EU enlargements

existing members
new members in 2007
Bulgaria
Romania

existing members
new members in 2013
Croatia

In 2007, the fifth enlargement completed with the accession of Bulgaria and Romania on 1 January. 53 MEPs joined the Parliament along with two commissioners, for which two new posts were created in the commission. The post created for the Romanian Commissioner was Multilingualism, which was criticised by some for its narrow scope. The EU encompasses 24 official languages, with various regional languages also officially recognized such as Catalan and Basque.

Negotiating process with Croatia as an official candidate country had been stalled for 10 months due to Slovenia's blockade of Croatia's EU accession, which was lifted in September 2009 after an agreement. Croatia joined the EU as the 28th member on 1 July 2013 in the sixth enlargement, marking the last state to join the EU before the UK's departure.

=== Proposed enlargement ===
Current members Candidates negotiating Candidates Applicants Candidates with frozen negotiations

The financial crisis hit Eurosceptic Iceland hard and its desire to seek haven in the EU and the euro led to it lodging its first formal application. Negotiations were expected to be concluded quickly. If disputes over fisheries were resolved and the Icelandic people consented, then Iceland would join. A new government was elected in Iceland during April 2013 and this government froze negotiations until a referendum could be held.

In an ongoing program of enlargement, there were nine other candidates: Albania, Bosnia and Herzegovina, Georgia, Moldova, North Macedonia, Montenegro, Serbia, Turkey and Ukraine. Also within the enlargement agenda were the states of Kosovo. Full membership negotiations between the EU and Turkey, which started in 2005, have been suspended since 2019.

=== Brexit ===
On 1 February 2020 CET (31 January GMT), the United Kingdom left the European Union in accordance with Article 50 of the Treaty on European Union. Between then and 31 December 2020, a transition period was in operation that kept in place all other aspects of the relationship to allow businesses to prepare and for a free trade agreement to be negotiated. The EU–UK Trade and Cooperation Agreement was subsequently signed and has applied provisionally since 1 January 2021.

== Euro and recession ==
2007 saw Slovenia adopt the euro, Malta and Cyprus in 2008, Slovakia in 2009, Estonia in 2011, Latvia in 2014, Lithuania in 2015, Croatia in 2023 and Bulgaria in 2026. However trouble developed with existing members as the eurozone entered its first recession in 2008. Members co-operated and the ECB intervened to help restore economic growth and the euro was seen as a safe haven, particularly by those outside such as Iceland.

However, with the risk of a default in Greece and other members due to the euro area crisis, eurozone leaders agreed to agree provisions for bailing out member states who could not raise funds. This was a U-turn on the EU treaties which rule out any bail out of a euro member to encourage them to manage their finances better. Yet with Greece struggling to restore its finances, other member states also at risk and the repercussions this would have on the rest of the eurozone economy; a bail out mechanism was agreed, though with the hope that it would never need to be used. The crisis also spurred consensus for further economic integration and a range of proposals such as a European Monetary Fund or federal treasury.

== Impact of the COVID-19 pandemic ==
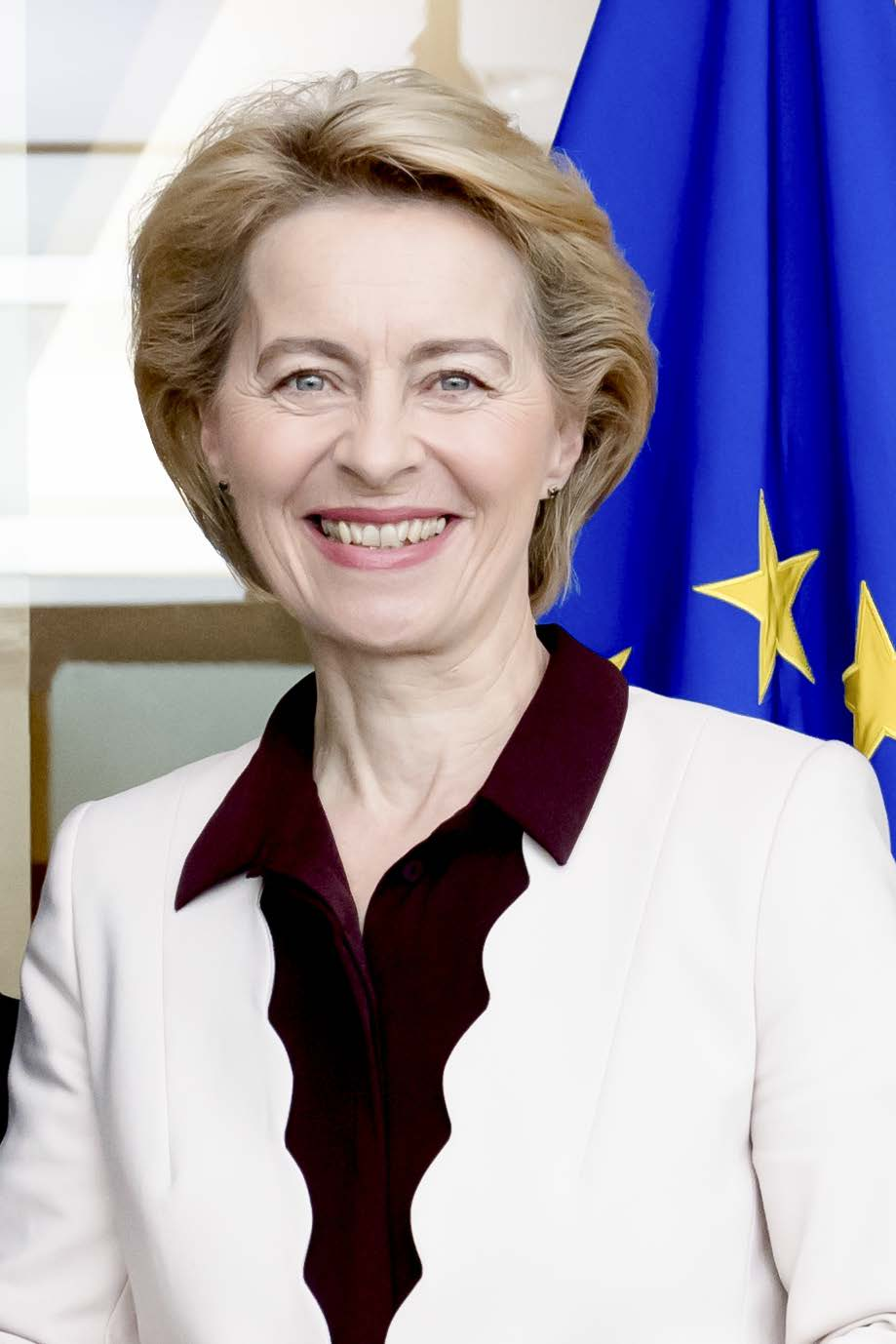
Ursula von der Leyen President of the European Commission (since 1 December 2019)

After the economic crisis caused by the COVID-19 pandemic the EU leaders agreed for the first time to emit common debt to finance the European Recovery Program called Next Generation EU (NGEU).

== Impact of the Russo-Ukrainian War ==
On 24 February 2022, after massing on the borders of Ukraine, the Russian Armed Forces undertook an attempt for a full-scale invasion of Ukraine.

The European Union imposed heavy sanctions on Russia and agreed on a pooled military aid package to Ukraine for lethal weapons funded via the European Peace Facility off-budget instrument. Likewise, neighbouring EU member countries received a mass influx of Ukrainian refugees fleeing the conflict over the course of the first weeks of the war. The conflict exposed the EU energy dependency on Russia, deemed as a supplier "explicitly" threatening the EU. This development injected a sense of urgency in the switch towards alternative energy suppliers and further development of clean energy sources.

== New Asyl policy and EU-List of safe countries of origin ==
On 10 February 2026 the European parliament voted for a new asylum policy and a EU-List of safe countries of origin.

== See also ==
- History of European integration (1948–1957)
- History of the European Communities (1973–1993)
- History of the European Union (1993–2004)
- Brexit
