= Timothy Garton Ash =

British historian and author (born 1955)

Timothy Garton Ash CMG FRSA FRHistS FRSL
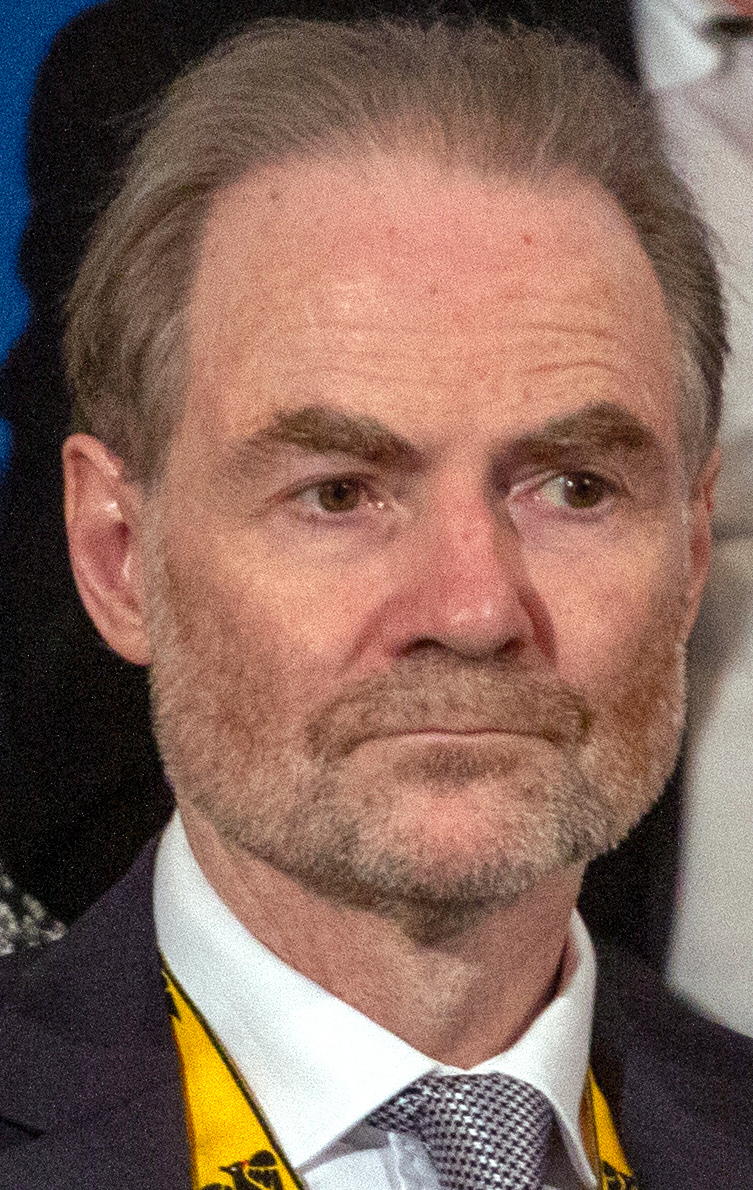
- Garton Ash in 2019
- Born: 12 July 1955 (age 71); London, England
- Occupations: Historian, author
- Title: Professor of European Studies
- Children: 2, including Alec
- Awards: Charlemagne Prize (2017)

Academic background
- Education: St Edmund's School; Sherborne School
- Alma mater: Exeter College, Oxford; St Antony's College, Oxford; Free University of Berlin; University of Berlin

Academic work
- Discipline: History
- Sub-discipline: Contemporary history; Revolutions of 1989; International relations since 1989; History of the European Union
- Institutions: St Antony's College, Oxford; Hoover Institution
- Doctoral students: Timothy Snyder
- Website: timothygartonash.com

Timothy Garton Ash CMG FRSA FRHistS FRSL (born 12 July 1955) is a British historian, author and commentator. He is Professor of European Studies emeritus at the University of Oxford and a Senior Fellow of Stanford University's Hoover Institution.

Most of his work has been concerned with the contemporary history of Europe, with a special focus on Central and Eastern Europe. In 1989, George Kennan described him as a 'historian of the present'.

He has written about the former Communist regimes of that region, their experience with the secret police, the Revolutions of 1989, and the transformation of the former Eastern Bloc states into member states of the European Union. He has also examined the role of Europe in the world and the challenge of combining political freedom and diversity, especially in relation to free speech.

== Education ==
Garton Ash was born to John and Lorna Garton Ash. His father was educated at Trinity Hall, Cambridge and was a decorated Royal Artillery officer in the British Army during the Second World War.

Garton Ash was educated at St Edmund's School, Hindhead, Sherborne School, Dorset and Exeter College, Oxford, where he studied Modern History.

For postgraduate study he went to St Antony's College, Oxford, and then, in the still divided Berlin, to the Free University in West Berlin on a German Academic Exchange Service scholarship in 1978 and to the Humboldt University in East Berlin in 1980 as the first GDR–UK exchange student. In West Berlin, he shared a flat with James Fenton. He abandoned his Oxford DPhil on Berlin during the Nazi rule to write about the German Democratic Republic. During his studies in East Berlin, he was under surveillance from the Stasi, which served as the basis for his 1997 book The File. Garton Ash cut a suspect figure to the Stasi, who regarded him as a "bourgeois-liberal" and potential British spy. Although he denies being or having been a British intelligence operative, Garton Ash described himself as a "soldier behind enemy lines" and described the German Democratic Republic as a "very nasty regime indeed".

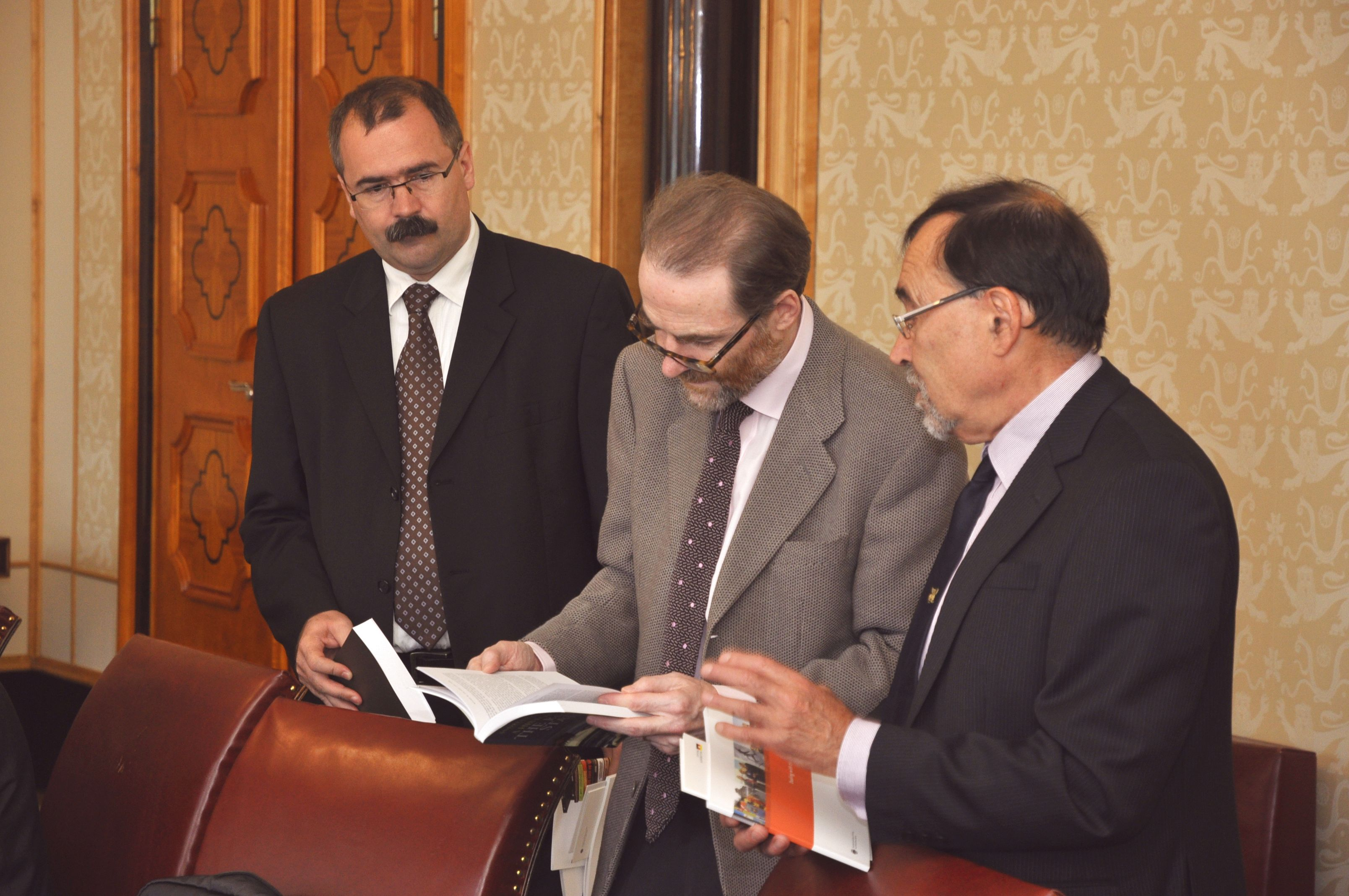
Pavel Žáček, Timothy Garton Ash and Kristian Gerner (Tallinn, 2012)

== Life and career ==
In the 1980s Garton Ash was Foreign Editor of The Spectator, editorial writer on Germany and Central Europe for The Times and a columnist for The Independent. He was among the first Western journalists to report from the Lenin Shipyard strike in Gdańsk, Poland in August 1980 that led to the Gdańsk Agreement, and met with Lech Wałęsa there. In January 1981, he covered the Rural Solidarity strike in Rzeszów and Ustrzyki Dolne, which resulted in the Rzeszów–Ustrzyki Agreement, and attended the National Coordinating Commission's internal discussions featuring Wałęsa. He interviewed Polish opposition leaders Bronisław Geremek, Jerzy Turowicz, Bohdan Cywiński, Jan Kielanowski and Jerzy Milewski, as well as the Deputy Minister of Agriculture Zdzisław Grochowski. Eventually expelled from the country, he also visited the Czechoslovak Socialist Republic, the Hungarian People's Republic, the People's Socialist Republic of Albania and the Socialist Republic of Bosnia and Herzegovina at key moments of their late history. He became involved with the Central and Eastern European Publishing Project (CEEPP), established in the United Kingdom in 1986 to "assist East European writers and publishers both at home and in exile". In 1986/1987, he was a fellow at the Woodrow Wilson International Center for Scholars in Washington, D.C. In his much-quoted essay "Does Central Europe Exist?" of 1986, he welcomed the resurgence of the former German notion of Central Europe as an anti-Soviet regional identity among the dissidents in Prague and Budapest. He was present at Viktor Orbán's speech on 16 June 1989 in the Heroes' Square in Budapest, and at the Fall of the Berlin Wall in November 1989. In March 1990, he was summoned by the Prime Minister Margaret Thatcher as an authority on Germany and one of "her favourite British historians" alongside Norman Stone and Hugh Trevor-Roper to answer her concerns about German reunification during a confidential seminar at Chequers that was later leaked out to the press.

He became a Fellow of St Antony's College, Oxford, in 1989, a Senior Fellow of Stanford University's Hoover Institution in 2000, and Professor of European Studies at the University of Oxford in 2004. He directed the European Studies Centre at St Antony's College, Oxford, from 2000 to 2006. He subsequently founded the Dahrendorf Programme at the European Studies Centre, and directed it from 2010 to 2024. He became a chair of its Academic Steering Committee.

He has written a column on European and international affairs in The Guardian since 2004 and is a long-time contributor to the New York Review of Books. His column was also translated in the Turkish daily Radikal, in the Spanish daily El País, and in the Italian daily “La Repubblica” as well as other newspapers. He is a member of the Reuters Institute for the Study of Journalism steering committee.

In 2005, Garton Ash was listed in Time magazine as one of the 100 most influential people. The article says that "shelves are where most works of history spend their lives. But the kind of history Garton Ash writes is more likely to lie on the desks of the world's decision makers."

== Geopolitics ==
Garton Ash describes himself as a liberal internationalist. He is a supporter of what he calls the free world and liberal democracy, represented in his view by the European Union, the United States as a superpower, and Angela Merkel's leadership of Germany. Garton Ash opposed Scottish independence and argued for Britishness, writing in The Guardian: "being British has changed into something worth preserving, especially in a world of migration where peoples are going to become ever more mixed up together. As men and women from different parts of the former British empire have come to live here in ever larger numbers, the post-imperial identity has become, ironically but not accidentally, the most liberal, civic, inclusive one."

Garton Ash first came to prominence during the Cold War as a supporter of free speech and human rights within countries which were part of the Soviet Union and Eastern Bloc, paying particular attention to Poland and Germany. In more recent times he has represented a British liberal pro-EU viewpoint, nervous at the rise of Vladimir Putin, Donald Trump and Brexit. He is strongly opposed to conservative and populist leaders of EU nations, such as Viktor Orbán of Hungary, arguing that Merkel should "freeze him out", evoking "appeasement". Garton Ash was particularly upset about Orbán's move against George Soros' Central European University. Anti-Soviet themes and Poland remain topics of interest for Garton Ash; once a promoter of the anti-Eastern Bloc movement in Poland, he notes with regret the move away from liberalism and globalism towards populism and authoritarianism under socially conservative political and religious leaders such as Jarosław Kaczyński, in a similar manner to his criticisms of Hungary's Orbán.

In reviewing his book, Homelands: A Personal History of Europe, veteran Newsweek journalist Andrew Nagorski wrote: "It bluntly describes the harsh political repression and monstrous economic failures that characterized the countries behind what was known as the Iron Curtain, while also evocatively capturing the 'abnormal normality' of a system that ruthlessly quashed all hopes for change, yet inspired people to 'make the best' of their seemingly hopeless situation." In that book, Garton Ash describes his meeting with Władysław Bartoszewski and having been "struck not only by the loud, rapid-fire voice of this senior member of the opposition, but also by his confident prediction that the Russian empire would collapse by the end of the century. This was at a time when the Cold War division of Europe appeared to be an unalterable fact of life."

== Personal life ==
Garton Ash and his Polish-born wife Danuta, whom he met in West Berlin, live in Oxford, England. Most summers they spend at Stanford University, California as part of his work with the Hoover Institution. They have two sons, Tom Ash, a web developer based in Canada, and Alec Ash, editor of the China Books Review and author of two books about China.

== Bibliography ==
- Und willst du nicht mein Bruder sein ... Die DDR heute (Rowohlt, 1981) ISBN 3-499-33015-6
- The Polish Revolution: Solidarity, 1980–82 (Scribner, 1984) ISBN 0-684-18114-2
- The Uses of Adversity: Essays on the Fate of Central Europe (Random House, 1989) ISBN 0-394-57573-3
- The Magic Lantern: The Revolution of 1989 Witnessed in Warsaw, Budapest, Berlin, and Prague (Random House, 1990) ISBN 0-394-58884-3; also published as We the people : the revolution of '89 witnessed in Warsaw, Budapest, Berlin & Prague (Cambridge : Granta, 1990) ISBN 978-0-14-014023-1
- In Europe's Name: Germany and the Divided Continent (Random House, 1993) ISBN 0-394-55711-5
- The File: A Personal History (Random House, 1997) ISBN 0-679-45574-4
- History of the Present: Essays, Sketches, and Dispatches from Europe in the 1990s (Allen Lane, 1999) ISBN 0-7139-9323-5
- Free World: America, Europe, and the Surprising Future of the West (Random House, 2004) ISBN 1-4000-6219-5
- Facts are Subversive: Political Writing from a Decade without a Name (Atlantic Books, 2009) ISBN 1-84887-089-2
- (edited, with Adam Roberts) Civil Resistance and Power Politics: The Experience of Non-violent Action from Gandhi to the Present (Oxford University Press, 2011) ISBN 9780199552016
- Free Speech: Ten Principles for a Connected World (Yale University Press, 2016) ISBN 978-0-300-16116-8
- (edited, with Adam Roberts, Michael J. Willis, and Rory McCarthy) Civil Resistance in the Arab Spring: Triumphs and Disasters (Oxford University Press, 2016) ISBN 9780198749028
- Obrona Liberalizmu (Fundacja Kultura Liberalna, 2022) ISBN 978-83-66619-06-7
- Homelands: A Personal History of Europe (Yale University Press, 2023) ISBN 9780300257076
- Europe in 7 1/2 Chapters: The Shortest Introduction to the World's Oldest and Newest Continent (Bodley Head, 2026) ISBN 9781847929174

== Awards and honours ==
- Somerset Maugham Award, for The Polish Revolution: Solidarity (1984)
- Prix Européen de l'Essai Charles Veillon (1989)
- Premio Napoli, for journalism (1995)
- Order of Merit from the Czech Republic
- Order of Merit from Germany
- Order of Merit of the Republic of Poland
- Honorary doctorate from St Andrews University, Scotland
- Hoffmann von Fallersleben Prize for political writing (2002)
- Companion of the Order of St Michael and St George (CMG)
- Fellow of the Royal Society of Literature (2005)
- Orwell Prize for journalism (2006)
- Kullervo Killinen Prize from Finland (2006)
- Honorary doctorate from KU Leuven, Belgium (2011)
- Fellow of the Royal Society of Arts (FRSA)
- Charlemagne Prize (2017)
- Member of the Polish Academy of Learning (2019)
- Lionel Gelber Prize for Homelands: A Personal History of Europe (2024)
- Honorary doctorate at Vytautas Magnus University, Lithuania (2024)
- Honorary doctorate at Charles University, Czech Republic (2025)

== See also ==
- European Council on Foreign Relations
- Appel de Blois
- Project Forum
- List of essay contributions to the New York Review of Books
