= David Barboza =

American journalist

- Education: Boston University (BA)
- Occupation: Journalist
- Employer: The Wire China
- Awards: Pulitzer Prize for Explanatory Reporting

David Barboza is an American journalist.

== Awards ==
In 2013 David Barboza was part of the winning team from the staff of The New York Times that received the Pulitzer Prize for Explanatory Reporting. Other staff members on this team included: Charles Duhigg, David Kocieniewski, Steve Lohr, John Markoff, David Segal, David Streitfeld, Hiroko Tabuchi, and Bill Vlasic. They received the award for the report that provided readers with a “penetrating look into business practices by Apple and other technology companies that illustrates the darker side of a changing global economy for workers and consumers.”

In the same year, Barboza received the Pulitzer Prize for International Reporting “for his striking exposure of corruption at high levels of the Chinese government, including billions in secret wealth owned by relatives of the prime minister, well documented work published in the face of heavy pressure from the Chinese officials.” This report – which became so controversial – resulted in a blocking of both the Chinese and English versions of The New York Times on the web from the government of China.

Barboza received two awards in The Society of American Business Editors and Writers (SABEW) 2007 Business Journalist of the Year Awards: one for a New York Times article, “A Chinese Reformer Betrays His Cause, and Pays.”

The year later, Barboza was a member of the team that took home the 2008 Grantham Prize for Environmental Reporting for the series “Choking on Growth: China’s Environmental Crisis.”

In 2002, Barboza participated in the team that earned the position of finalist for a Pulitzer Prize for coverage of the Enron scandal. And in that same year, he received The Times's internal business award, known as the Nathaniel Nash Award.

He earned three Gerald Loeb Awards. He shared the 2005 award for the Deadline Writing category for the story "End of an Era", the 2008 award for the Large Newspapers category for the story "Toxic Pipeline", and the 2013 award for the International category for the story "China's Secret Fortunes".

== Journalistic ventures ==
In 1997, Barboza was a staff writer for The New York Times. Prior to that, he was still connected to the journal, working as a research assistant and freelance writer. Then, in November 2004, he took on the role of Shanghai's correspondent for The New York Times in China. Four years later he was promoted to the Shanghai bureau chief. He was also working out of Chicago as the NYT's Midwest business correspondence.

Barboza also addresses large crowds of students and other interested parties about his work in investigative reporting and how to be a success.

In April 2020, he co-founded The Wire China. The magazine describes itself as "a digital news magazine dedicated to understanding and explaining one of the biggest stories of our time: China’s economic rise, and its influence on global business, finance, trade, labor and the environment". In October 2023 he also co-founded the China Books Review, a "digital magazine that publishes insightful, intelligent commentary on all things China books-related" edited by Alec Ash.

== Education ==
Barboza has a bachelor's degree in history from Boston University. While there, he worked on the student newspaper. He also studied history at Yale Graduate School.

== Personal information ==
Barboza has held a long-time interest in writing since his father bought him a typewriter back when he was in high school. He first showed an interest in China when he was at college and then when he found in 2004 there was a job vacancy in Shanghai, he jumped at the chance, saying “If The New York Times didn’t send me to China, I would quit my job and go to China to study Chinese…There was just something about China that made me say, ‘This is the place I want to live in’.” He left China in 2015, after receiving death threats following his reporting on government corruption.
