= Alec Ash =

British writer (born 1986)

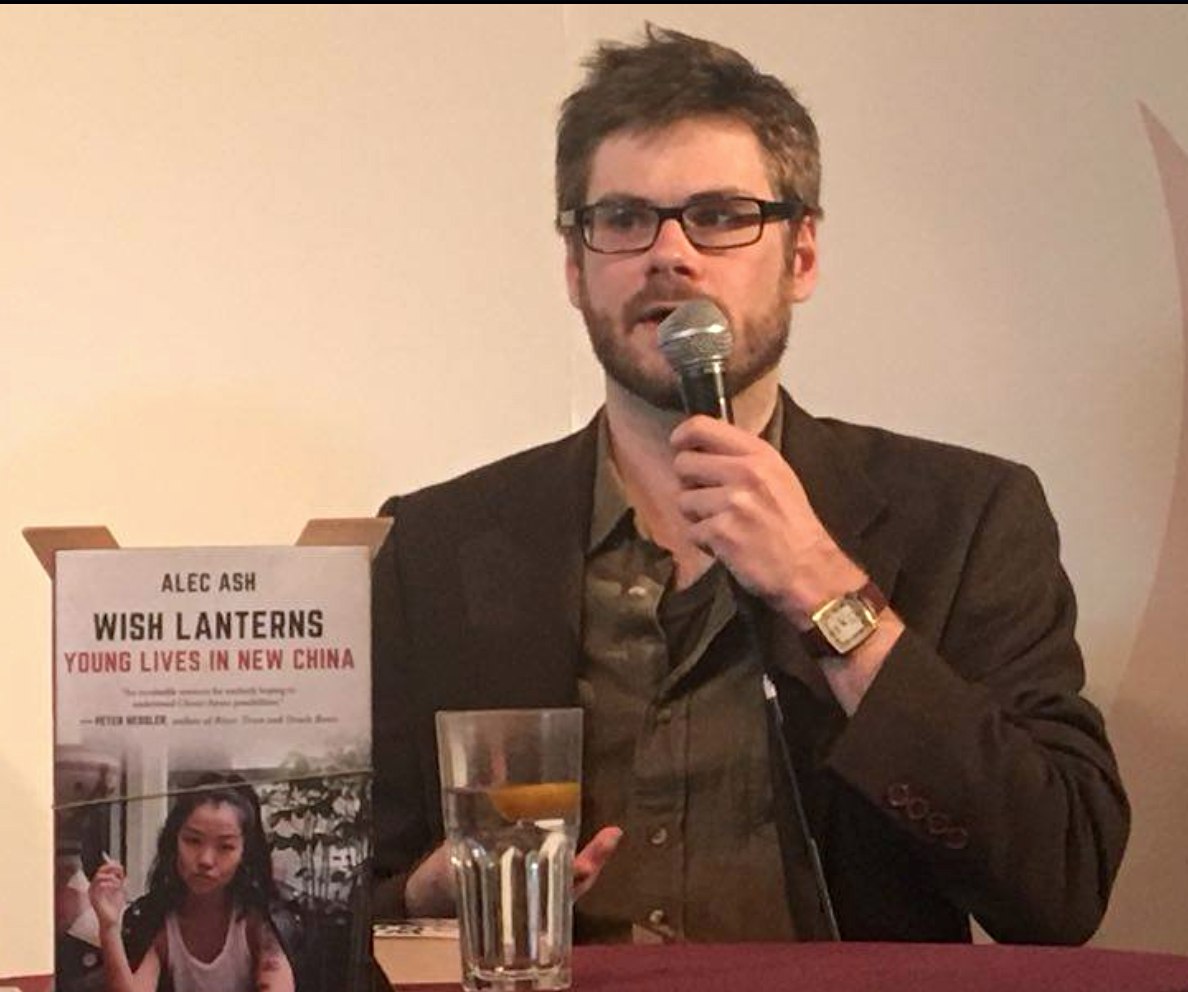
Alec Ash giving a talk at the Beijing Bookworm Literary Festival in 2018

Alec Ash (born 1986) is a British writer and editor known for his extensive work on China, where he lived from 2008 to 2022. He is a senior fellow at Asia Society in New York, where he edits the China Books Review. He has written two books of literary non-fiction about China, as well as numerous articles.

== Biography ==
Alec Ash was born in Oxford, England, in 1986 and is the son of historian Timothy Garton Ash. He attended the University of Oxford, where he studied English literature at Corpus Christi College. From 2008 to 2010, he studied Chinese at Peking University and Tsinghua University. In 2012, living in Beijing, Ash founded the website the Anthill, described as a "writers' colony" for stories from China which later got merged into the Los Angeles Review of Books China Channel, with Ash as the editor. Ash has written for publications including the New York Review of Books, and wrote dispatches as a stringer for The Sunday Times and The Economist. His essays have been featured in anthologies such as Chinese Characters and While We're Here. He delivered a TedX talk in Beijing on Chinese youth, and shared his experience of running a marathon in Pyongyang in an interview with PRX's The World. In 2020 he moved to the rural region of Dali, Yunnan, before leaving China in 2022. In 2023, he assumed the role of editor for the China Books Review, published by Asia Society and The Wire China.

Ash's notable literary contributions include the reportage book Wish Lanterns, delving into the lives of young Chinese people in Beijing. The book was honored as a BBC Radio 4 Book of the Week and has garnered widespread translation and reviews. Ash's second book, The Mountains Are High, has received acclaim for its reporting on rural China, and was a NPR "Books We Love" for 2024. Author Peter Hessler has characterized him as "a talented young observer of today's China", while scholar David Moser has labeled him "the king of feral sinologists". In a New York Times interview, Ash said of millennial Chinese that they are "the thin end of a wedge that is slowly prying China open through generational and societal shifts, in a way that politics clearly hasn't".

== Publications ==
- Ash, Alec (2012, contributor): Chinese Characters: Profiles of Fast-Changing Lives in a Fast-Changing Land (University of California Press)
- Ash, Alec (2015, contributor): While We’re Here: China Stories from a Writers’ Colony (Earnshaw Books)
- Ash, Alec (2016, author): Wish Lanterns: Young Lives in New China (Picador) ISBN 978-1-4472-3796-9
- Ash, Alec (2020, author): China’s New Youth: How the Young Generation Is Shaping China's Future (Arcade)
- Ash, Alec (2024, author): The Mountains Are High: A Year of Escape and Discovery in Rural China (Scribe)
