= Supranational union =

Multinational political union with a central authority

A supranational union is a type of international organization and political union that is empowered to directly exercise some of the powers and functions otherwise reserved to states. A supranational organization involves a greater transfer of or limitation of state sovereignty than other kinds of international organizations.

The European Union (EU) has been described as a paradigmatic case of a supranational organization, as it has deep political, economic and social integration, which includes a common market, joint border control, a supreme court, and regular popular elections.

Another method of decision-making in international organisations is intergovernmentalism, in which state governments play a more prominent role.

== Origin as a legal concept ==
After the dropping of atomic bombs on Hiroshima and Nagasaki in August 1945, Albert Einstein spoke and wrote frequently in the late 1940s in favour of a "supranational" organization to control all military forces except for local police forces, including nuclear weapons. He thought this might begin with the United States, the Soviet Union and the United Kingdom, and grow to encompass most other nations, presenting this as the only way to avoid nuclear war. He broached the idea in the November 1945 and November 1947 articles in The Atlantic Monthly that described how the constitution of such an organization might be written. In an April 1948 address at Carnegie Hall, he reiterated: "There is only one path to peace and security: the path of supranational organization." Thanks to his celebrity, Einstein's ideas on the subject generated much discussion and controversy, but the proposal did not generate much support in the West and the Soviet Union viewed it with hostility.

With its founding Statute of 1949 and its Convention on Human Rights and Fundamental Freedoms, which came into force in 1953, the Council of Europe created a system based on human rights and the rule of law. Robert Schuman, French foreign minister, initiated the debate on supranational democracy in his speeches at the United Nations, at the signing of the council's Statutes and a series of other speeches across Europe and North America.

The term "supranational" occurs in an international treaty for the first time (twice) in the Treaty of Paris on 18 April 1951. This new legal term defined the community method in creating the European Coal and Steel Community and the beginning of the democratic re-organisation of Europe. It defines the relationship between the High Authority or European Commission and the other four institutions. In the treaty, it relates to a new democratic and legal concept.

The Founding Fathers of the European Community and the present European Union said that supranationalism was the cornerstone of the governmental system. This is enshrined in the Europe Declaration made on 18 April 1951, the same day as the European Founding Fathers signed the Treaty of Paris.

"By the signature of this Treaty, the participating Parties give proof of their determination to create the first supranational institution and that thus they are laying the true foundation of an organised Europe. This Europe remains open to all nations. We profoundly hope that other nations will join us in our common endeavour."

This declaration of principles that included their judgement for the necessary future developments was signed by Konrad Adenauer (West Germany), Paul van Zeeland and Joseph Meurice (Belgium), Robert Schuman (France), Count Sforza (Italy), Joseph Bech (Luxembourg), and Dirk Stikker and Jan van den Brink (The Netherlands). It was made to remind future generations of their historic duty of uniting Europe based on liberty and democracy under the rule of law. Thus, they viewed the creation of a wider and deeper Europe as intimately bound to the healthy development of the supranational or Community system.

This Europe was open to all nations who were free to decide, a reference/or an invitation and encouragement of liberty to the Iron Curtain countries. The term supranational does not occur in succeeding treaties, such as the Treaties of Rome, the Maastricht Treaty, the Treaty of Nice or the Constitutional Treaty or the very similar Treaty of Lisbon.

== Distinguishing features of a supranational union ==
A supranational union is a supranational polity that lies somewhere between a confederation that is an association of sovereign states and a federation that is a single sovereign state. The European Economic Community was described by its founder Robert Schuman as midway between confederalism which recognises the complete independence of states in an association and federalism which seeks to fuse them into a super-state. The EU has supranational competencies, but it possesses these competencies only to the extent that they are conferred on it by its member states (Kompetenz-Kompetenz). Within the scope of these competencies, the union exercises its powers in a sovereign manner, having its own legislative, executive, and judicial authorities. The supranational Community also has a chamber for organised civil society including economic and social associations and regional bodies.

The union has legal supremacy over its member states only to the extent that its member state governments have conferred competencies on the union. It is up to the individual governments to ensure that they have full democratic backing in each of the member states. The citizens of the member states, though retaining their nationality and national citizenship, additionally become citizens of the union, as is the case with the European Union.

The European Union, the only clear example of a supranational union, has a parliament with legislative oversight, elected by its citizens. To this extent, a supranational union like the European Union has characteristics that are not entirely dissimilar to the characteristics of a federal state like the United States of America. However, the differences in scale become apparent if one compares the United States federal budget with the budget of the European Union (which amounts only to about one percent of combined GDP) or the size of the federal civil service of the United States with the Civil Service of the European Union.

== Supranationalism in the European Union ==
Historically the concept was introduced and made a concrete reality by Robert Schuman when the French Government agreed to the principle in the Schuman Declaration and accepted the Schuman Plan confined to specific sectors of vital interest of peace and war. Thus commenced the European Community system beginning with the European Coal and Steel Community. The six founder States (France, Italy, West Germany, the Netherlands, Belgium and Luxembourg) agreed on the goal: making "war not only unthinkable but materially impossible". They agreed on the means: putting the vital interests, namely coal and steel production, under a common High Authority, subject to common democratic and legal institutions. They agreed on the European rule of law and a new democratic procedure.

The five institutions (besides the High Authority) were a Consultative Committee (a chamber representing civil society interests of enterprises, workers and consumers), a parliament, and a Council of government ministers. A Court of Justice would decide disputes coming from governments, public or private enterprises, consumer groups, any other group interests or even an individual. A complaint could be lodged in a local tribunal or national courts, where appropriate. Member states have yet to fulfil and develop the articles in the Paris and Rome treaties for full democracy in the European Parliament and other institutions such as the Economic and Social Committee and the Committee of Regions.

Schuman described supranational unions as a new stage in human development. It contrasted with destructive nationalisms of the nineteenth and twentieth centuries that began in glorious patriotism and ended in wars. He traced the beginning concept of supranationality back to the nineteenth century, such as the Postal Union, and the term supranational is used around the time of the First World War. Democracy, which he defined as "in the service of the people and acting in agreement with it", was a fundamental part of a supranational community. However, governments only began to hold direct elections to the European Parliament in 1979, and then not according to the treaties. A single electoral statute was specified in the treaty for Europe's first community of coal and steel in 1951. Civil society (largely non-political) was to have its own elected chamber in the Consultative Committees specific to each Community as democratically agreed, but the process was frozen (as were Europe's parliamentary elections) by Charles de Gaulle and other politicians who opposed the Community method.

Today supranationalism only exists in the two European Communities inside the EU: the Economic Community (often called the European Community although it does not legally cover all State activities) and Euratom (the European Atomic Energy Community, a non-proliferation community, in which certain potentialities have been frozen or blocked). Supranational Communities provide powerful but generally unexploited and innovatory means for democratic foreign policy, by mobilising civil society to the democratically agreed goals of the Community.

The first Community of Coal and Steel was agreed only for fifty years. Opposition, mainly by enterprises that had to pay a small European tax of less than 1% and government ministers in the council, led to its democratic mandate not being renewed. Its jurisprudence and heritage remain part of the European Community system.

De Gaulle attempted to turn the European Commission into a political secretariat under his control in the Fouchet Plan but this move was thwarted by such democrats in the Benelux countries as Paul-Henri Spaak, Joseph Luns and Joseph Bech as well as a large wave of other pro-Europeans in all the Community countries.

The supranational Community method came under attack, not only from de Gaulle but also from other nationalists and Communists. In the post-de-Gaulle period, rather than holding pan-European elections under a single statute as specified in all the treaties, governments held and continue to hold separate national elections for the European Parliament. These often favour the major parties and discriminate against smaller, regional parties. Rather than granting elections to organised civil society in the consultative committees, governments created a three-pillar system under the Amsterdam Treaty and Maastricht Treaty, mixing intergovernmental and supranational systems. Two pillars governing External policy and Justice and Home affairs are not subject to the same democratic controls as the Community system.

In the Lisbon Treaty and the earlier nearly identical Constitutional Treaty, the democratic independence of the five key institutions is further blurred. This moves the project from full democratic supranationalism in the direction of not just intergovernmentalism but the politicisation of the institutions, and control by two or three major party political organisations. The Commission defines key legal aspects of the supranational system because its members must be independent of commercial, labour, consumer, political or lobby interests (Article 9 of the Paris Treaty). The commission was to be composed of a small number of experienced personalities, whose impartiality was beyond question. As such, the early presidents of the Commission and the High Authority were strong defenders of European democracy against national, autocratic practice or the rule of the strong over the weak.

The idea in the Constitutional and Lisbon Treaties is to run the European Commission as a political office. Governments would prefer to have a national member on the commission, although this is against the principle of supranational democracy. (The original concept was that the commission should act as a single impartial college of independent, experienced personalities having public confidence. One of the Communities was defined in the treaty as a Commission with fewer members than the number of its member states.) Thus, the members of the commission are becoming predominantly party-political, and composed of sometimes rejected, disgraced or unwanted national politicians.

The first president of the High Authority was Jean Monnet, who never joined a political party, as was the case with most of the other members of the Commissions. They came from diverse liberal professions, having made recognised European contributions.

Governments also wish to retain the secrecy of their deliberations in the Council of Ministers or the European Council, which discusses matters of the most vital interest to European citizens. While some institutions such as the European Parliament have their debates open to the public, others such as the Council of Ministers and numerous committees are not. Schuman wrote in his book, Pour l'Europe (For Europe), that in a democratic supranational Community, "the Councils, committees and other organs should be placed under the control of public opinion that was effectual without paralysing their activity nor useful initiatives".

=== Categorising European supranationalism ===
Joseph H. H. Weiler, in his work The Dual Character of Supranationalism, states that there are two main facets to European supranationalism, although these seem to be true of many supranational systems. These are:

- Normative supranationalism: The Relationships and hierarchy that exist between Community policies and legal measures on one hand and the competing policies and legal measures of the member states on the other (the executive dimension)
- Decisional supranationalism: The institutional framework and decision-making by which such measures are initiated, debated, formulated, promulgated and, finally, executed (the legislative-judicial dimension)

In many ways, the split sees the separation of powers confined to merely two branches.

== Comparing the European Union and the United States ==
In the Lisbon Treaty, the distribution of competencies in various policy areas between member states and the European Union is redistributed in three categories. Competences not explicitly listed belong to lower levels of governance.

EU exclusive competence	EU shared competence	EU supporting competence	US exclusive competence
The Union has exclusive competence to make directives and conclude international agreements when provided for in a Union legislative act.	Member states cannot exercise competence in areas where the Union has done so.	The Union can carry out actions to support, co-ordinate or supplement member states' actions.	U.S. federal government in the 19th century.
the customs union; the establishing of the competition rules necessary for the functioning of the internal market; monetary policy for the member states whose currency is the euro; the conservation of marine biological resources under the common fisheries policy; common commercial (trade) policy	the internal market; social policy, for the aspects defined in this Treaty; economic, social and territorial cohesion; agriculture and fisheries, excluding the conservation of marine biological resources; environment; consumer protection; transport; trans-European Networks; energy; the area of freedom, security and justice; common safety concerns in public health matters, for the aspects defined in this Treaty; Common Foreign and Security Policy	the protection and improvement of human health; industry; culture; tourism; education, youth, sport and vocational training; civil protection (disaster prevention); administrative cooperation	Internal improvements; Subsidies (mainly to shipping); Tariffs; Disposal of public lands; Immigration law; Foreign policy; Copyrights; Patents; Currency

== Democratic deficit in the EU and other supranational unions ==
In a supranational union, the problem of how to reconcile the principle of equality among nation-states, which applies to international (intergovernmental) organisations, and the principle of equality among citizens, which applies within nation-states is resolved by taking a sectoral approach. This allows an innovatory, democratic broadening the number of actors to be included. These are present not only in the classical Parliament which has slightly different functions but also in the Consultative Committees such as the European Economic and Social Committee and the Committee of the Regions which the treaties give powers equivalent to parliaments in their areas but which are at present still developing their potential. In the European Union, the Lisbon Treaty mixes two principles (classical parliamentary government with a politically elected government) and a supranational community with an independent European Commission.

Governments are also trying to treat the Lisbon Treaty as a simple classical treaty, or even an amendment to one, which does not require citizens' support or democratic approval. The proposed Lisbon Treaty and the earlier Constitutional draft still retain in the European Union elements of a supranational union, as distinct from a federal state on the lines of the United States of America. But this is at the expense of the democratic potentialities of a full supranational union as conceived in the first Community.

== Other international organisations with some degree of integration ==
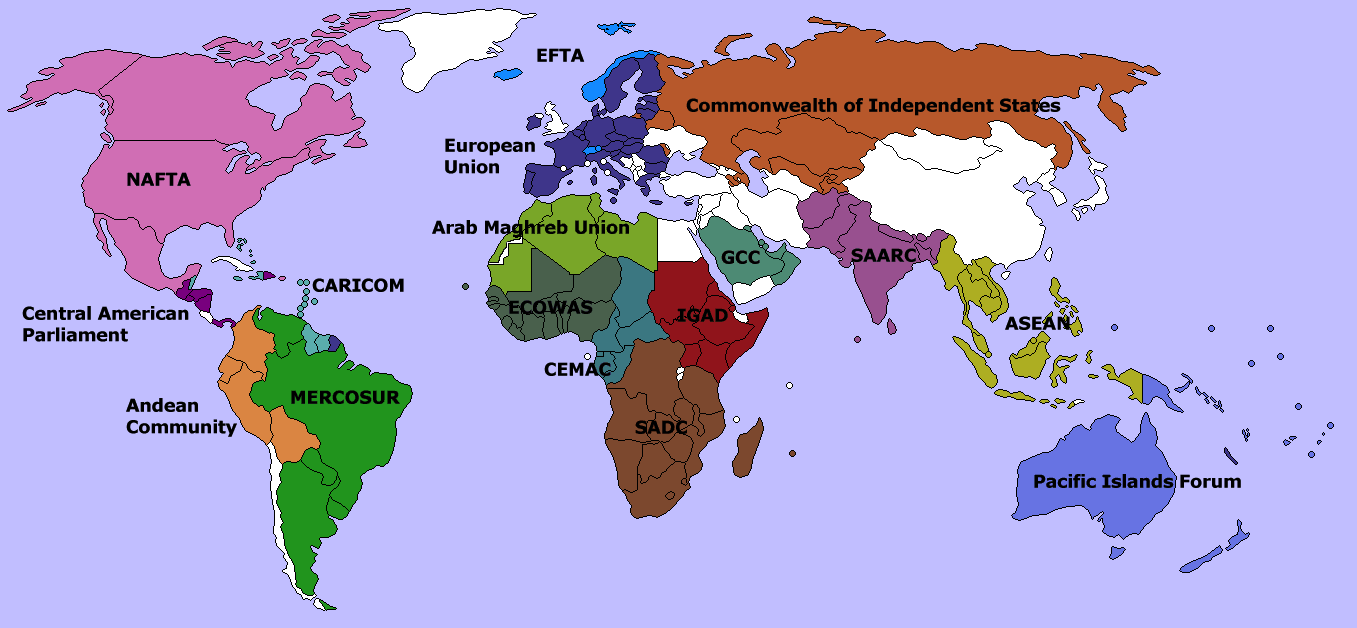
Global map showing several regional organisations of non-overlapping memberships as of the early 2020s

The only union generally recognised as having achieved the status of a supranational union is the European Union.

Although the Soviet Union was created under an initial ideological appearance of forming a supranational union, it never de facto functioned as one, and constitutionally was a federation; see Republics of the Soviet Union § Constitutional status for details.

There are several other regional organisations that, while not supranational unions, have adopted or intend to adopt policies that may lead to a similar sort of integration in some respects.

- African Union (AU)
- Association of Southeast Asian Nations (ASEAN)
- Benelux, a political union of Belgium, The Netherlands, and Luxembourg. Though part of the EU, EU treaties contain an exception that EU law does not preclude further Benelux integration.
- Caribbean Community (CARICOM)
- Central American Integration System (SICA)
- Commonwealth of Independent States (CIS), a successor organization to the Soviet Union
- Community for Democracy and Rights of Nations
- Cooperation Council for the Arab States of the Gulf (Gulf Cooperation Council) (GCC)
- Economic Cooperation Organization (ECO)
- Eurasian Economic Union (EAEU)
- Group of 77 (G77) is a coalition of 134 developing countries, designed to promote its members' collective economic interests and create an enhanced joint negotiating capacity in the United Nations. It was founded by non-aligned states during the Cold War.
- Organization of Ibero-American States (OEI)
- Organization of the Black Sea Economic Cooperation (BSEC)
- Organization of Turkic States
- Pacific Alliance, a Latin American trade bloc
- South Asian Association for Regional Cooperation (SAARC)
- Union of South American Nations (USAN)
- Union State, a union of the Russian Federation and Belarus

Other organisations that have also discussed greater integration include:

- Arab League into an "Arab Union"
- Pacific Islands Forum into the "Pacific Union"
- Community of Latin American and Caribbean States (CELAC) into the "Latin American Union"
- East African Community into the "East African Federation"
- Economic Community of Central African States (CEMAC)
- Economic Community of West African States (ECOWAS)

== See also ==
- Civic nationalism
- Constitutional patriotism
- Continental union
- Confederation
- Democratic globalization
- Devolution
- Economic union
- Federation
- History of the European Coal and Steel Community (1945–57)
- International human rights law
- International parliament
- List of economic communities
- List of free trade agreements
- List of military alliances
- List of supranational environmental agencies
- Multi-level governance
- Neofunctionalism
- New world order (Baháʼí)
- Regional integration
- Robert Schuman
- Schuman Declaration
- Staatenverbund
- Supranational aspects of international organizations
- Supranational law
- Transnationality
- Transnational citizenship
- United Nations Parliamentary Assembly
- World government
