= Europe Declaration =

The Europe Declaration, also known as the Charter of the Community, was a joint statement issued by the Foreign Ministers of Belgium, France, Italy, Luxembourg, the Netherlands, and West Germany in 1951. The Declaration was issued at the signing of the Treaty of Paris, which created the European Coal and Steel Community (ECSC) based on the Schuman Plan, on 18 April 1951.

The Europe Declaration said that the ECSC marked the birth of Europe as a political, economic and social entity, reflecting the principles that Robert Schuman had announced in the Schuman Declaration of 1950. It included the statement:

By the signature of this Treaty, the involved parties give proof of their determination to create the first supranational institution and that thus they are laying the true foundation of an organised Europe. This Europe remains open to all European countries that have freedom of choice. We profoundly hope that other countries will join us in our common endeavour.

The Declaration was signed by Konrad Adenauer (West Germany), Joseph Bech (Luxembourg), Robert Schuman (France), Count Carlo Sforza (Italy), Dirk Stikker and Jan van den Brink (Netherlands), and Paul van Zeeland and Joseph Meurice (Belgium). It was intended to remind future generations of their historic duty of uniting Europe based on liberty and democracy under the rule of law. Thus, the signers viewed the declaration as an important first step in the development of an integrated Europe.
