= Supranational aspects of international organizations =

Many international organizations also have supranational aspects, meaning that decisions can be made by the organization as a whole that are binding on member states that disagree.

== Definition ==
Political Unification Revisited: On Building Supranational Communities by Amitai Etzioni offers the definition of supranationality that is used in this entry. Etzioni writes that supranationality can be thought of as "a composite of several elements." These elements can be present alone or all together. The three elements of supranationality are defined as follows:

1. Making of significant decisions by a body that is not made of national representatives and that does not receive instructions from national governments. (Though such a body is frequently elected by national authorities or their constituents. Frequently such a body is made up of officials acting in an individual capacity.)
2. The subjects or participants (national governments or individuals) are legally obligated to comply with the decisions of the body.
3. Individuals or other private parties may interact directly with the body and/or have legal obligations as stated above.

== Examples ==
European Court of Human Rights	Founded 1950, Reformed 1998
Aspect	Supranational Element
Judges of the Court serve in an individual capacity. Though elected by the Parliamentary Assembly of the Council of Europe, they receive no instructions from States or any entity outside the court and cannot be dismissed but by a vote of two thirds of their own grouping.	1
The Court can rule against the government of the offending States Parties. Judgements of the Court as to remedies for rights violations are binding on States Parties.	2
The jurisdiction of the Court is automatically compulsory. The statute of the Court is a part of the European Convention on Human Rights and thus states party to the Convention are party to the Court. While not having initial jurisdiction over complaints, there is no provision for refusal by States brought before the Court.	2
Citizens of States Parties to the European Convention on Human Rights may bring their human rights grievances directly to an international body of judges (the Court), albeit only when all domestic remedies have been exhausted.	3

Inter-American Court of Human Rights	Founded 1979
Aspect	Supranational Element
The Court can rule against the government of a State Party it finds has violated the American Convention on Human Rights. Judgements of the Court as to remedies for rights violations are binding on States Parties.	2
States may accept compulsory jurisdiction of contentious cases through declaration. This means any other State Party accepting compulsory jurisdiction may bring a case against it before the Court. Alternatively the state declaring compulsory jurisdiction may be brought before the court by the Inter-American Commission on Human Rights over a complaint filed by an individual to the Commission.	2
Note: Unlike the European Court of Human Rights, there is no provision for direct application by individuals to the Court. Rather individuals must file a complaint with the Inter-American Commission on Human Rights, which may decide after exhausting non-contentious measures of resolution, to submit the complaint to the Court, on the condition the State Party to the Convention has accepted the jurisdiction of the Court.

International Court of Justice	Founded 1922, Reformed 1945
Aspect	Supranational Element
The judges which compose the Court serve in a personal capacity, and though they are elected by the General Assembly on the advice of the Security Council, they are forbidden from receiving instructions from national governments or any entity outside the Court.	1
ICJ rulings in contentious cases are binding on the States Parties to the dispute. Thus its decisions have the status of a treaty obligation for the State Party in question.	2
In case of non-compliance with decisions, the ICJ may refer a state party to the Security Council for enforcement, although this provision has never been used.	2
The ICJ Statute is a self-executing treaty, meaning (dependent on the Constitutional provisions of the State Party in question) the provisions of the treaty are enforceable in the respective legal structures of States Parties, indistinguishable from national laws of the State Party. Taken with fact that decisions its decisions are indistinguishable in obligation from the Statute of the ICJ itself, the decisions of the ICJ have the status of national law in national courts.	2
The Court has the power in a contentious case to indicate any provisional measures for the preservation of the rights of either party.	2
States parties to the ICJ Statute may declare acceptance of the jurisdiction of the Court in all cases. This means that any other state party having declared compulsory jurisdiction as well may bring the state party before the Court for an alleged violation of international law. Should the ICJ decide to take up the dispute, the party is required to defend itself in a case before the ICJ and accept the decision of the Court. Certain treaties also confer on the ICJ compulsory jurisdiction over the treaty.	2

International Criminal Court	Founded 2002
Aspect	Supranational Element
The Prosecutor may independently open investigations into cases of widespread violation of the Statute, such as war crimes, genocide, and crimes against Humanity, given the consent of the Pre-Trial Chamber. The Prosecutor may conduct investigations on the territory of a State Party.	1
Judges and members of the Office of the Prosecutor serve in a personal capacity and, though accountable to the Assembly of States Parties, act entirely independently and without instruction from national governments or any entity outside the Court.	1
The Court has jurisdiction over persons, who are individually responsible and punishable for crimes under the Statute, such as war crimes, genocide, and crimes against humanity.	2, 3
The Pre-Trial Chamber may, after an investigation by the Prosecutor and on the application of the Prosecutor, issue a warrant of arrest for an individual if it has reasonable grounds to believe the individual has committed a crime under the Statute involved in the case under investigation by the Prosecutor.	2, 3
Arrest warrants are binding on States Parties, which are obligated to take steps to arrest the person in question immediately.	2
The Prosecutor of the Court, with the consent of the Pre-Trial Chamber, consisting of three judges, is authorized to directly summon a person if there are reasonable grounds to believe the person committed an alleged crime under the Statute and a summons is sufficient to ensure the person's appearance.	3
Individuals concerned have the right to challenge an arrest warrant at the international level and apply at the international level for release pending trial.	3

International Seabed Authority	Founded 1994
Aspect	Supranational Element
The Authority organizes, carries out, and controls activities in the seabed and ocean floor (the Area) on behalf of mankind.	2
The Authority may adopt regulations for the protection of human life, the marine environment, and for the prospecting, exploration, and exploitation in the Area.	2
The Council of the Authority issues plans of work (contracts) for private parties for activities in the Area.	3

International Tribunal for the Law of the Sea	Founded 1994
Aspect	Supranational Element
The Tribunal has automatic compulsory jurisdiction. All States Parties to the United Nations Convention on the Law of the Sea are States Parties to the ITLOS, as its Statute is contained in the Convention. Any other state party may bring any other state party before the Tribunal for an alleged violation of the Convention, should the Tribunal accept the case.	2
The decisions of the Tribunal are binding on parties to a dispute brought before it.	2
The decisions of the Tribunal's Seabed Disputes Chamber are enforceable in the territory of the parties to a dispute in the same manner as the highest court of the State Parties.	2

North American Free Trade Agreement	Agreed 1992
Aspect	Supranational Element
The decisions of NAFTA arbitral panels apply to and are binding on private parties and individuals.	2
States Parties to NAFTA have initial jurisdiction over anti-dumping violations of the Agreement, which may be brought before the court by private parties and individual persons against private parties and individual persons in another State Party. However, if the first private party seeks an appeal of the highest court within its State, the other private party may bring the case before a NAFTA arbitral panel.	3

Organisation for the Prohibition of Chemical Weapons	Founded 1997
Aspect	Supranational Element
The Organization sends inspectors to search suspected sites of substances prohibited by the Convention in the territory of States Parties. This includes governmental and private sites alike.	1, 3
CWC Inspection teams are appointed by and accountable to the Technical Secretariat of the OPCW, and operate in their capacity as persons, not representatives of states.	1
Under implementing legislation, refusing inspections by the OPCW is a violation of national law. Inspection teams are, however, required to notify a State Party when they begin a search.	2

Security Council	Founded 1945
Aspect	Supranational Element
The members of the United Nations agree that in carrying out its duties in maintaining peace and security, the Security Council Acts on their behalf.	2
The members of the United Nations agree to accept and carry out the decisions of the Security Council. Thus Security Council resolutions are binding on involved member states, or even on all member states.	2
The Security Council may compel the members states to apply measures decided upon to give effect to its decisions, such as diplomatic or economic sanctions.	2
The Security Council may take action through the use of military force to enforce its decisions and maintain or restore international peace and security. This provision has been used somewhat infrequently – the Korean War (1950), intervention in the Congo Crisis(1961), the First Gulf Conflict (1991)	2
The Security Council may enforce the decisions of the International Court of Justice, although this provision has never been used.	2
The Security Council may create subsidiary organs to assist in carrying out its functions. Since the decisions of the Security Council are binding, the effect is that such subsidiary organs can add new ways for the Council to exercise its obligations. The most prominent examples of this were the creation of the International Criminal Tribunal for the Former Yugoslavia and the International Criminal Tribunal for Rwanda.	3
The Statute of the International Criminal Court confers upon the Security Council an ability to refer situations of war crimes, crimes against humanity, or genocide in states not party to the Statute to the ICC for investigation and prosecution.	3

United Nations General Assembly	Founded 1945
Aspect	Supranational Element
The 1950 General Assembly resolution number 377 recognizes the right of the General Assembly, when the veto of a permanent member causes the Security Council to fail in maintaining the peace, to recommend the use of all actions including military force to preserve the peace. Paragraph 7 further recommends that member states maintain armed forces ready to be made available to serve as UN units up the recommendation of the Security Council or General Assembly. Used in Suez Crisis, 1956, Soviet Intervention in Hungary, 1956, the Lebanon-Jordan crisis, 1958, etc.	2

World Trade Organization	Founded 1994
Aspect	Supranational Element
The WTO Council can, with the votes of a three-fourths majority of member states, adopt an interpretation of trade agreements falling under WTO jurisdiction.	2
WTO Dispute Resolution Panels have compulsory jurisdiction, in that any state may bring an alleged violation of WTO trade law by another state to a panel for adjuciation.	2
Decisions of dispute resolution panels are binding on state parties.	2
WTO Panel decisions may be enforced through authorization for slighted parties to undertake retaliatory trade sanctions.	2
