= The Wire China =

Weekly online news magazine

- Type: Weekly online news magazine
- Founder: David Barboza
- Editor: Tom Mitchell, Andrew Peaple
- Staff writers: Rachel Cheung, Noah Berman, Savannah Billman, Peiyue Wu
- Founded: 2020
- Language: English
- Headquarters: New York
- Country: United States
- Website: www.thewirechina.com

The Wire China is a weekly online news magazine focused on Chinese business, economics and finance, founded by former The New York Times Shanghai correspondent David Barboza.

== History ==
The Wire China launched its first issue in April 2020. It publishes five to six articles per week including a 3,000-5,000 word cover story, a news and analysis piece, a data investigation called 'The Big Picture', Q&A, and an Opinion section. The magazine also publishes a regular books column and the occasional long essay. In 2020 it published cover stories investigating the accounting scandal of Luckin Coffee, whistleblowers at GlaxoSmithKline China's operations, and Chinese aerospace company Aviation Industry Corporation of China's acquisition of American companies during the GFC.

Content is behind a paywall, with monthly and annual subscriptions available.

== Coverage ==
According to its website, The Wire China's news coverage focuses on:

China largely from beyond its borders, so we are focused on looking at the country from a global perspective. How do China based businesses invest and operate outside of the country? How do multinationals operate inside China? Who are China's leading entrepreneurs and startups, and how have they succeeded or failed? How do cross border deals work? How do Americans, Europeans and others invest in China, and how do Chinese businesses invest overseas? When it comes to business, what happens at the intersection of China and the rest of the world? And is there a way to put today's dynamics in perspective with a historical piece, looking back at the origins of a conflict, or development?

In 2020, when the Chinese government moved to take over billionaire Xiao Jianhua's assets, The Wire China first reported that Xiao Jianhua's Tomorrow Group put out a statement that was later censored. In the statement, the Tomorrow Group questioned the takeover decisions of the China Securities Regulatory Commission and the China Banking and Insurance Regulatory Commission, as well as the Chinese government's risk assessment.

In September 2020, The Wire China interviewed Steve Bannon on his relationship with Chinese fugitive Miles Kwok.

Orville Schell, the Arthur Ross Director of the Center on U.S.-China Relations at the Asia Society in New York wrote a long essay for the website titled "The Death of Engagement" which was praised by The New York Times opinion columnist Thomas Friedman.

Its coverage on the practice of Chinese billionaires using trusts to hide their money in South Dakota was cited in a Hudson Institute report on kleptocracy and foreign corruption.

The publication has published several pieces on semiconductors in the U.S.-China relationship. Willy Shih, a Professor of Management Practice at Harvard Business School, gave an interview to the publication about the United States falling behind in semiconductor technology. Similarly, it ran a piece on how Chinese regulatory approval complicated U.S. chip firm Nvidia's pending acquisition of Israeli chip firm Mellanox Technologies.

On May 30, 2021, The Wire China published a detailed whistleblower report on securities fraud about CLSA and CEFC China Energy called "Broken Bonds".

In April, 2023, The Wire China announced a new collaboration with Asia Society to launch the China Books Review, a major outlet of commentary on China-related publications.

== WireScreen ==
WireScreen is The Wire China's sister business that focuses on providing data and information on Chinese companies and individuals. It often appears in The Wire China, especially in the data section, 'The Big Picture'. It incorporates research from The Wire China journalists as well as other data sources. In an interview with Harvard's Nieman Lab, Barboza explained his rationale for launching WireScreen:

Traditionally, journalists are on one side and they do their research, and then they throw it away and don't give it to anyone else. I think how wasteful is it that most journalists throw away or never use or don't pass on any of their notes or records. Everyone that comes behind them does their research all over again.

The database has over a million companies, and data engineers continue to collect and add information. Its target customers include other journalists, policy makers, scholars, and the business community.
