= Appel de Blois =

Appel de Blois is an initiative in 2008 by Liberté pour l’Histoire to work against legislative authorities criminalizing the past through the legislative, thus putting more and more obstacles in the way of historical research. It was signed by historians such as Carlo Ginzburg, Eric Hobsbawn, and Jacques Le Goff. The appeal, which was directed at the European public, particularly scholars, historians, and academics, called for the rejection of "moralisation" and "judicialisation" of history through the codification of the so-called memory laws.

The initiative asks people to sign up under this:

Concerned about the retrospective moralization of history and intellectual censure, we call for the mobilization of European historians and for the wisdom of politicians.

History must not be a slave to contemporary politics nor can it be written on the command of competing memories. In a free state, no political authority has the right to define historical truth and to restrain the freedom of the historian with the threat of penal sanctions. We call on historians to marshal their forces within each of their countries and to create structures similar to our own, and, for the time being, to individually sign the present appeal, to put a stop to this movement toward laws aimed at controlling history memory. We ask government authorities to recognize that, while they are responsible for the maintenance of the collective memory, they must not establish, by law and for the past, an official truth whose legal application can carry serious consequences for the profession of history and for intellectual liberty in general.

In a democracy, liberty for history is liberty for all.
