= Schuman Declaration =

1950 proposal for European industrial integration

- Presented: 9 May 1950
- Author(s): Robert Schuman, Jean Monnet
- Purpose: To propose European integration

Video of an excerpt from Schuman's speech where he says "In taking upon herself for more than 20 years the role of champion of a united Europe, France has always had as her essential aim the service of peace. A united Europe was not achieved and we had war. Europe will not be made all at once, or according to a single plan. It will be built through concrete achievements which first create a de facto solidarity."

The Schuman Declaration, or Schuman Plan, was a proposal to place French and West German production of coal and steel under a single authority. It later became the European Coal and Steel Community, made by the French foreign minister, Robert Schuman, on 9 May 1950 (now celebrated in the EU as Europe Day), the day after the fifth anniversary of the end of World War II in Europe. The alliance would later be opened to other European countries. The ultimate goal was to pacify relations, especially between France and West Germany, through gradual political integration, achieved by creating common interests. Schuman said that "[t]he coming together of the countries of Europe requires the elimination of the age-old opposition of France and Germany [...] the solidarity in production thus established will make it plain that any war between France and Germany becomes not merely unthinkable, but materially impossible."

Konrad Adenauer (first chancellor of the Federal Republic of Germany), responded positively to the Declaration, as did the governments of the Netherlands, Belgium, Italy, and Luxembourg. On 18 April 1951, the six founding members signed the Treaty of Paris. It created the European Coal and Steel Community – Europe's first supranational community, which paved the way for the European Economic Community and subsequently the European Union.

== Background ==
Following World War II, the Cold War split Europe between two spheres of influence on either side of the Iron Curtain. To avoid repeating the destruction of the First and Second World Wars, there was a push toward European co-operation. For example, Winston Churchill, called for the formation of a "Council of Europe". The United States supported greater European cooperation, and when Marshall Plan aid was announced, the only condition imposed was that the aid be used by the European countries in a coordinated fashion.

The Monnet Plan, France's plan to spur investment and modernise the French economy after World War II, created an impetus for the Schuman Plan. Before the war, France was the world's largest importer of coal, and the Monnet Plan anticipated coal imports from Germany. In this country, there were concerns that France aimed to import coal from Germany "as cheaply as possible" to promote French steel production. In France, the concern (which dated to the prewar period) was that coal would be available on more favourable terms to the German market and so provide an advantage to German industry. Schuman aimed to prevent coal and steel firms from acting as cartels which could restrict supply by national market. The Schuman Plan would mean the pooling of markets and the expansion of production. This was viewed as a force for peace in Europe, since the single market would make a war between France and Germany "materially impossible."

Schuman promoted initiatives to unite Europe as Prime Minister of France (1947–48) and foreign minister from 1948–52. He spoke about the principles of sharing European resources in a supranational union at the signing of the Statute of the Council of Europe in London, 5 May 1949.

== Aims and drafting ==
In drafting the Schuman Declaration, Jean Monnet had input from Paul Reuter, a consultant in international law to the French foreign ministry and Professor of Law at Aix-en-Provence; and Etienne Hirsch. (The draft documents of the Declaration were published by the Jean Monnet Foundation.)

The Schuman proposal was agreed on after the French cabinet discussion on 9 May 1950. Earlier in the day, Schuman had been assured that it had the support of German Chancellor Konrad Adenauer.

The Schuman Declaration says, "The coming together of the nations of Europe requires the elimination of the age-old opposition of France and Germany." The French government "proposes that Franco-German production of coal and steel as a whole be placed under a common High Authority, within the framework of an organization open to the participation of other countries of Europe." The pooling of coal and steel production should allow for a common foundation for economic development and "will make it plain that any war between France and Germany becomes not merely unthinkable, but materially impossible." Importantly, by pooling basic production and by instituting the new High Authority — whose decisions bind France, Germany and other member countries — "this proposal will lead to the realization of the first concrete foundation of a European federation indispensable to the preservation of peace."

The Declaration had several aims:

- the birth of Europe as a political entity
- to make war between member states impossible
- to encourage peace in the world
- to form an anti-cartel agency in the coal and steel industries of member countries
- to revitalise the European economy as a whole starting with the coal and steel sectors
- to offer production in coal and steel to the world without distinction or exception, with the aim of raising living standards and promoting international development, including in Africa.

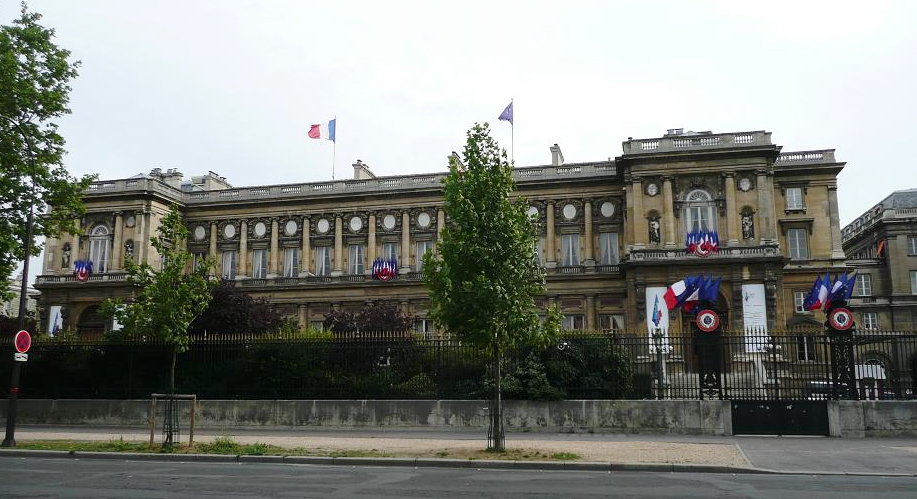
The speech was made at Quai d'Orsay, home of the French Foreign Ministry

== Legacy ==
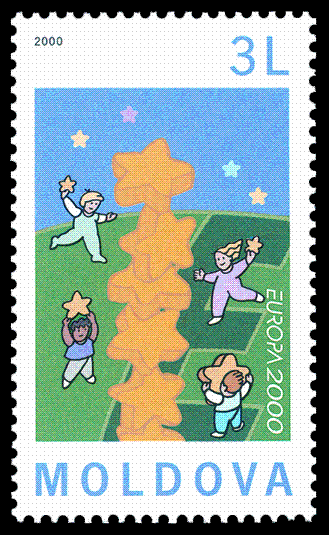
2000 stamp. 50 years of Schuman's declaration.

The Schuman Declaration marked the beginning of post-World War II Franco-German cooperation and the re-integration of West Germany into Western Europe. Konrad Adenauer, Chancellor of West Germany, said "[t]hat's our breakthrough" in regard to the Declaration. The legacy of this initiative was the signing of the Treaty of Paris on 18 April 1951, by six European countries (France, Germany, Belgium, Italy, Luxembourg and the Netherlands). The Treaty established the European Coal and Steel Community (ECSC), the first of three European Communities, and a predecessor of the European Union.

The ECSC introduced a common market for steel and coal across the member countries, with freely set market prices, free movement of products, and without customs duties or taxes, subsidies, or restrictive practices. It set up a High Authority to monitor compliance with competition rules and ensure price transparency.

Schuman supported further European integration through an (ultimately unratified) European defence community. In 1958, he became the first President of the predecessor to the European Parliament. When he left office, the Parliament bestowed on him the title "Father of Europe". May 9 has been designated "Europe Day" to celebrate peace and unity in Europe because of the significance of the Schuman Declaration on 9 May 1950.

== See also ==
- Council of Europe
- History of the European Communities (1945–1957)
- Robert Schuman
- European Coal and Steel Community

== Bibliography ==
- Diebold, William. The Schuman plan: a study in economic cooperation, 1950–1959 (Praeger, 1959).
- Hitchcock, William I. "France, the Western Alliance, and the Origins of the Schuman Plan, 1948–1950" Diplomatic History (1997) 21#4: 603–630. doi:10.1111/1467-7709.00090.
- Kaiser, Wolfram. Christian democracy and the origins of European Union (Cambridge UP, 2007).
- Lovett, A. W. "The United States and the Schuman Plan. a study in French diplomacy 1950–1952". Historical Journal 39#2 (1996): 425–455.
- McDougall, Walter. "Political Economy versus National Sovereignty: French Structures for German Economic Integration after Versailles". The Journal of Modern History 51#1 (1979): 4–23.
- Mahant, Edelgard Elsbeth. Birthmarks of Europe: the origins of the European Community reconsidered (Gower Publishing, 2004).
- Scheingold, Stuart A. The rule of law in European integration: The path of the Schuman Plan (Quid Pro Books, 2013).
- Shore, Cris. "Inventing the 'People's Europe': Critical Approaches to European Community 'Cultural Policy.'" Man 28, no. 4. (Dec., 1993): 779–800.
- Shore, Cris and Annabel Black. "The European Communities and the Construction of Europe". Anthropology Today 8, no. 3. (Jun., 1992): 10–11.
- Schuman, Robert. Pour l'Europe (Paris 1963).
- Vernon, Raymond. "The Schuman Plan: Sovereign Powers of the European Coal and Steel Community". American Journal of International Law 47.2 (1953): 183–202. JSTOR 2194820.
