= Referendums related to the European Union =

This is a list of referendums related to the European Union, or referendums related to the European Communities, which were predecessors of the European Union. Since 1972, a total of 49 referendums have been held by EU member states, candidate states, and their territories, with several additional referendums held in countries outside the EU. The referendums have been held most commonly on the subject of whether to become a member of European Union as part of the accession process, although the EU does not require any candidate country to hold a referendum to approve membership or as part of treaty ratification. Other EU-related referendums have been held on the adoption of the euro and on participation in other EU-related policies.

The United Kingdom is the only country as an EU member state to have held referendums directly on continued membership of the European Union and its antecedent organisation, the European Communities. In the first referendum in 1975, continued membership of what was then the European Communities (which included the European Economic Community, often referred to as the Common Market in the UK) (Note: The 1975 United Kingdom European Communities membership referendum question was as follows: "Do you think the United Kingdom should stay in the European Community (the Common Market)?") was approved by 67.2% of voters, while in its second referendum in 2016 voters voted by 51.9% to leave the European Union, effectively reversing the result of the first referendum. (Note: The 2016 United Kingdom European Union membership referendum question was as follows: "Should the United Kingdom remain a member of the European Union or leave the European Union?")

Greenland, an autonomous territory of Denmark, voted to leave the EC in a referendum in 1982 by 53% of voters.

== Summary of referendums on membership ==
Country	Year	Vote (%)	Turnout (%)	Result
Denmark	1972	63.3 / 36.7	90.1	Joined
France	1972	68.3 / 31.7	60.2	Approved
Norway	1972	46.5 / 53.5	79.0	No action
Ireland	1972	83.1 / 16.9	70.9	Joined
United Kingdom	1975	67.2 / 32.8	64.6	Remained (No action)
Greenland	1982	47.0 / 53.0	74.9	Left
Åland	1994	73.6 / 26.4	49.1	Joined
Austria	1994	66.6 / 33.4	82.3	Joined
Finland	1994	56.9 / 43.1	70.8	Joined
Norway	1994	47.8 / 52.2	89.0	No action
Sweden	1994	52.3 / 47.7	83.3	Joined
Switzerland	1997	25.9 / 74.1	35.4	No action
Switzerland	2001	23.2 / 76.8	55.8	No action
Czech Republic	2003	77.3 / 22.7	55.2	Joined
Estonia	2003	66.8 / 33.2	64.1	Joined
Hungary	2003	83.8 / 16.2	45.6	Joined
Latvia	2003	67.5 / 32.5	71.5	Joined
Lithuania	2003	91.1 / 8.9	63.4	Joined
Malta	2003	53.6 / 46.4	90.9	Joined
Poland	2003	77.6 / 22.4	58.9	Joined
Slovakia	2003	93.7 / 6.3	52.1	Joined
Slovenia	2003	89.6 / 10.4	60.2	Joined
Croatia	2012	66.7 / 33.3	43.5	Joined
San Marino	2013	50.3 / 49.7	49.7 (Note: Quorum of 32% of registered voters in favour required for referendum to be valid not met.)	No action
United Kingdom	2016	48.1 / 51.9	72.2	Left
Macedonia (since 2019 North Macedonia)	2018	94.2 / 5.8	36.9 (Note: Turnout was around 37%, less than the 50% threshold required to validate the results.)	No action
Moldova	2024	50.4 / 49.6	51.7	Approved Joining
Iceland	2026	47.16 / 52.84	82.6	No action

== EC enlargement of 1973 ==
In 1972, four countries held referendums on the subject of the 1973 enlargement of the European Communities.

- France — 1972 French European Communities enlargement referendum, 23 April 1972, 68.3% in favour, turnout 60.5%

Before allowing the four new candidate member states to join the European Communities, founding member France held a referendum that approved this. Following the French approval, three of the four candidate states (Ireland, Denmark and Norway) likewise held referendums on the issue of joining the European Communities. The United Kingdom did not hold a referendum before joining.

- Ireland — a referendum to approve the Third Amendment of the Constitution of Ireland, 10 May 1972, 83.1% in favour, turnout 70.9%
- Norway — 1972 Norwegian European Communities membership referendum, 25 September 1972, 53.5% against, turnout 79%

Following the rejection by the Norwegian electorate, Norway did not join.

- Denmark — 1972 Danish European Communities membership referendum, 2 October 1972, 63.3% in favour, turnout 90.1%

Denmark, Ireland, and the United Kingdom were admitted as members of the EC, acceding on 1 January 1973.

== United Kingdom's European Communities membership, 1975 ==
- United Kingdom — 1975 United Kingdom European Communities membership referendum, 5 June 1975, 67.2% in favour, turnout 64.0%

The Conservative government of Edward Heath did not hold a referendum before the United Kingdom joined the European Communities in 1973. The Labour Party's manifesto for the 1974 general election included a pledge for an in-out referendum after a renegotiation of its membership. Accordingly, after Labour won under Harold Wilson, the referendum was held on whether to remain in the Communities after a renegotiation of its membership. The result was in favour of remaining.

== Greenland's European Communities membership, 1982 ==
- Greenland — 1982 Greenlandic European Communities membership referendum, 23 February 1982, 53.0% against

In 1973, Greenland joined the European communities as part of Denmark. However, after the establishment of home-rule and eurosceptic Siumut winning the 1979 Greenlandic general election, a referendum on membership was agreed upon, in which the voters rejected remaining part of the communities. This resulted in Greenland negotiating the terms of its separation from the EU, resulting in the Greenland Treaty, and Greenland's leaving the communities in 1985.

== Single European Act ==
Two referendums were held in EU countries to permit them to ratify the Single European Act.

- Denmark — 1986 Danish Single European Act referendum, 26 February 1986, 56.2% in favour, turnout 75.4%
- Ireland — a referendum to approve the Tenth Amendment of the Constitution of Ireland, 26 May 1987, 69.9% in favour, turnout 44.1%

== Maastricht Treaty ==
- Italy — 1989 Italian advisory referendum, 18 May 1989, 88.1% in favour, turnout 81.0%

Before the negotiations on the treaty of Maastricht began, Italy held a consultative referendum to give the European Parliament a popular mandate to elaborate a future European Constitution. After the treaty was signed, three countries held referendums on its ratification.

- Ireland — a referendum to approve the Eleventh Amendment of the Constitution of Ireland, 18 June 1992, 69.1% in favour, turnout 57.3%
- France — 1992 French Maastricht Treaty referendum, 20 September 1992, 51.0% in favour, turnout 69.7%
- Denmark — The 1992 Danish Maastricht Treaty referendum, 2 June 1992, 50.7% against, turnout 83.1%

In Denmark, two referendums were held before the treaty of Maastricht passed. The first one rejected the treaty.

- Denmark — The 1993 Danish Maastricht Treaty referendum, 18 May 1993, 56.7% in favour, turnout 86.5%

After the defeat of the treaty in the first referendum, Denmark negotiated and received four opt-outs from portions of the treaty: Economic and Monetary Union, Union Citizenship, Justice and Home Affairs, and Common Defence. The second referendum approved the treaty amended with the opt-outs.

== EU enlargement of 1995 ==
In 1994, four countries, and one dependency, held referendums on membership of the EU, resulting in the 1995 enlargement of the European Union.

- Austria — 1994 Austrian European Union membership referendum, 12 June 1994, 66.6% in favour, turnout 82.3%
- Finland — 1994 Finnish European Union membership referendum, 16 October 1994, 56.9% in favour, turnout 70.8%
- Sweden — 1994 Swedish European Union membership referendum, 13 November 1994, 52.3% in favour, turnout 83.3%
- Åland Islands — 1994 Ålandic European Union membership referendum, 20 November 1994, 73.6% in favour, turnout 49.1%

The Åland Islands, a semi-autonomous dependency of Finland, also voted on their accession to the European Union. The favourable vote meant that EU law would apply also to the Åland Islands.

- Norway — 1994 Norwegian European Union membership referendum, 28 November 1994, 52.2% against, turnout 89.0%

For the second time, Norwegian voters rejected the Norwegian government's proposal to join the EU.

Austria, Sweden, and Finland were admitted as members of the EU, acceding on 1 January 1995.

== Treaty of Amsterdam, 1998 ==
Two countries held referendums on the ratification of the treaty of Amsterdam.

- Ireland — a referendum to approve the Eighteenth Amendment of the Constitution of Ireland, 22 May 1998, 61.7% in favour, turnout 56.2%
- Denmark — 1998 Danish Amsterdam Treaty referendum, 28 May 1998, 55.1% in favour, turnout 76.2%

== Treaty of Nice, 2001 ==
- Ireland — a referendum to approve the Twenty-fourth Amendment of the Constitution Bill, 2001 (Ireland), 7 June 2001, 53.9% against, turnout 34.8%

In 2001, Irish voters rejected the Treaty of Nice, in the so-called "Nice I referendum".

- Ireland — a referendum to approve the Twenty-sixth Amendment of the Constitution of Ireland, 19 October 2002, 62.9% in favour, turnout 49.5%

In the so-called "Nice II referendum" in 2002, statements on Ireland not having to join a common defence policy and affirming the right to decide on enhanced cooperation in the national parliament were stressed in a special document, resulting in a favourable vote.

== EU enlargement of 2004 ==
The 2004 enlargement of the European Union involved ten candidate states, eight from Central and Eastern Europe, and the Mediterranean islands of Malta and Cyprus. In 2003, referendums on joining the EU were held in all these nations except Cyprus.

- Malta — 2003 Maltese European Union membership referendum, 8 March 2003, 53.6% in favour, turnout 90.9%
- Slovenia — 2003 Slovenian European Union and NATO membership referendum, 23 March 2003, 89.6% in favour, turnout 60.2%
- Hungary — 2003 Hungarian European Union membership referendum, 12 April 2003, 83.8% in favour, turnout 45.6%
- Lithuania — 2003 Lithuanian European Union membership referendum, 10–11 May 2003, 91.9% in favour, turnout 63.4%
- Slovakia — 2003 Slovak European Union membership referendum, 16–17 May 2003, 93.7% in favour, turnout 52.1%
- Poland — 2003 Polish European Union membership referendum, 7–8 June 2003, 77.5% in favour, turnout 58.9%
- Czech Republic — 2003 Czech European Union membership referendum, 13–14 June 2003, 77.3% in favour, turnout 55.2%
- Estonia — 2003 Estonian European Union membership referendum, 14 September 2003, 66.8% in favour, turnout 64.1%
- Latvia — 2003 Latvian European Union membership referendum, 20 September 2003, 67.5% in favour, turnout 71.5%

Since the results were in favourable in all cases, all ten candidate countries were admitted as members of the EU, acceding on 1 May 2004.

== Euro ==
Denmark and the United Kingdom received opt-outs from the Maastricht Treaty and do not have to join the euro unless they choose to do so; Sweden has not received an opt-out, yet deliberately does not live up to the requirements for joining. Two referendums have been held on the issue, both of which rejected accession.

- Denmark — 2000 Danish euro referendum, 28 September 2000, 53.2% against, turnout 87.6%
- Sweden — 2003 Swedish euro referendum, 14 September 2003, 55.9% against, turnout 82.6%

== European Constitution, 2005 ==
Several member states used or intended to use referendums to ratify the Treaty establishing a Constitution for Europe (TCE).

- Spain — 2005 Spanish European Constitution referendum, 20 February 2005, 81.8% in favour, turnout 41.8%
- France — 2005 French European Constitution referendum, 29 May 2005, 54.7% against, turnout 69.4%
- Netherlands — 2005 Dutch European Constitution referendum, 1 June 2005, 61.5% against, turnout 63.3%
- Luxembourg — 2005 Luxembourgian European Constitution referendum, 10 July 2005, 56.5% in favour, turnout 90.4%

Referendums were planned, but not held, in:

- Czech Republic — Czech European Constitution referendum
- Denmark — Danish European Constitution referendum
- Ireland — Irish European Constitution referendum
- Poland — Polish European Constitution referendum
- Portugal — Portuguese European Constitution referendum
- United Kingdom — United Kingdom European Constitution referendum

== Treaty of Lisbon ==
Only one member state, Ireland, obliged by their constitution, decided on ratification of the Treaty of Lisbon through a referendum.

- Ireland — a referendum to approve the Twenty-eighth Amendment of the Constitution Bill, 2008 (Ireland), 12 June 2008, 53.2% against, turnout 53.1%

In 2008, Irish voters rejected the Treaty of Lisbon.

- Ireland — a referendum to approve the Twenty-eighth Amendment of the Constitution of Ireland, 2 October 2009, 67.1% in favour, turnout 59.0%

After the first vote by Ireland on the Lisbon Treaty, the European Council and the Irish Government released separate documents, referred to as the "Irish Guarantees", that stated the other member countries would not use the possibility in the Treaty to diminish the number of permanent commissioners in favour of a rotating system with fewer commissioners, and not threaten Ireland's military neutrality and rules on abortion. With these assurances, the Irish approved the unchanged Lisbon Treaty in a second referendum.

== European Fiscal Compact, 2012 ==
- Ireland — a referendum to approve the Thirtieth Amendment of the Constitution of Ireland, 31 May 2012, 60.4% in favour, turnout 50.5%

== EU enlargement of 2013 ==
- Croatia — 2012 Croatian European Union membership referendum, 22 January 2012, 66.7% in favour, turnout 43.5%

Croatia was admitted as a member of the EU, acceding on 1 July 2013.

== San Marino membership application ==
A referendum was held in San Marino on whether the country should submit an application to join the European Union as a full member state.

- San Marino – 2013 San Marino referendum, 20 October 2013, 50.3% in favour, turnout 43.4% (quorum of 32% of registered voters in favour required for referendum to be valid not met.)

== Unified Patent Court ==
The Unified Patent Court is a proposed court between several EU member states, that, inter alia, is to be constituted for litigation related to the European Union patent.

- Denmark — 2014 Danish Unified Patent Court membership referendum, 25 May 2014, 62.5% in favour, turnout 55.9%

== Greek bailout referendum, 2015 ==
- Greece — 2015 Greek bailout referendum, 5 July 2015, 61.3% against, turnout 62.5%

A referendum on the bailout conditions in the Greek government-debt crisis. A majority of the voters rejected the bailout conditions. However, shortly afterwards the government accepted a bailout with even harsher conditions than the ones rejected by the voters.

== Danish EU opt-out referendum, 2015 ==
- Denmark The 2015 Danish European Union opt-out referendum, 53.1% against, turnout 72.0%

The referendum was held to decide on converting the opt-out from participation in the area of Justice and Home Affairs area into an opt-in: the possibility for the Danes to decide on a case-by-case basis. The voters rejected the proposal.

== Dutch Ukraine–European Union Association Agreement referendum, 2016 ==
- Netherlands — 2016 Dutch Ukraine–European Union Association Agreement referendum, 6 April 2016, 61.0% against, turnout 32.2%

A consultative referendum upon a request of 427,939 Dutch citizens, based on the Advisory Referendum Act 2015.

== United Kingdom's European Union membership, 2016 ==
- United Kingdom — 2016 United Kingdom European Union membership referendum, 23 June 2016, 51.9% to leave, turnout 72.2%

In February 2016, the Conservative government of David Cameron negotiated "a new settlement for Britain in the EU" which was then followed by a referendum on the UK's membership of the European Union in the United Kingdom and Gibraltar. The result was in favour of the UK leaving the EU and the deal was discarded. There were proposals for a second referendum on the terms of the withdrawal agreement reached between the EU and UK, but none was ultimately held. The UK formally withdrew from the EU on 31 January 2020.

== Hungary migrant quota referendum, 2016 ==
- Hungary — 2016 Hungarian migrant quota referendum, 2 October 2016, 98.4% against, turnout 44.0%

A referendum was held to decide whether Hungary should accept migrant quotas imposed by the EU without the National Assembly's approval or not. Most of the opposition parties called for a boycott. The turnout was too low to make the poll valid.

== Macedonia membership, 2018 ==
- Macedonia – 2018 Macedonian referendum, 30 September 2018, 94.2% in favour, turnout 36.9%

A referendum was held in Macedonia (since 2019 North Macedonia) in September 2018 on whether they supported EU and NATO membership by accepting the Prespa Agreement between Macedonia and Greece, signed in June 2018, which aimed to settle their 27-year naming dispute, which had prevented Macedonia from joining both the European Union and NATO. Despite 94% of voters voting in favour, voter turnout was around 37%, less than the 50% threshold required to validate the results.

== Danish EU opt-out referendum, 2022 ==
- Denmark – 2022 Danish European Union opt-out referendum, 1 June 2022, 66.8% in favour, turnout 65.7%

A referendum on the abolition of Denmark's opt-out from the European Union's defense cooperation.

== Poland migrant quota referendum, 2023 ==
- Poland — 2023 Polish migrant quota referendum, 15 October 2023 96.79% against, turnout 40.91%

A referendum was held to decide whether Poland support the admission of thousands of illegal immigrants from the Middle East and Africa, in accordance with the forced relocation mechanism imposed by the European bureaucracy?. Most of the opposition parties called for a boycott. The turnout was too low to make the poll valid.

== Moldova membership goal in the constitution, 2024 ==
- Moldova – 2024 Moldovan European Union membership constitutional referendum, 20 October 2024, 50.4% in favour, turnout 51.7%

A referendum was held in Moldova in October 2024 on whether to amend to constitution to include the goal of the country joining the EU. Previously, on 2 February 2014 the Autonomous Territorial Unit of Gagauzia within Moldova held a referendum in which 97.2% opposed further integration with the EU. There is concern in Gagauzia that Moldova's integration with the EU could lead to unification with EU member Romania, which is unpopular in the autonomous region.

== Icelandic European Union membership negotiations referendum, 2026 ==
- Iceland - 2026 Icelandic European Union membership negotiations referendum, 29 August 2026, 52.8% against

A referendum was held in Iceland in August 2026 on whether to resume negotiations on accession of Iceland to the European Union, after they were suspended in 2014. With a vote of 52.8%, Iceland narrowly voted against resuming negotiations.

== Agreements between Switzerland and the EU ==
- Switzerland — 1972: Free trade agreement with the EC, 72.5% in favour
- Switzerland — 1992: EEA Agreement with all EU member states and all EFTA member states as well as the European Communities, 50.3% against
- Switzerland — 1997: Requiring the approval of a referendum and the Cantons to launch accession negotiations with the EU, 74.1% against
- Switzerland — 2000: Bilateral I agreements with the EU, 67.2% in favour
- Switzerland — 2001: Opening negotiations for EU membership, 76.8% against
- Switzerland — 2005: Schengen Agreement and the Dublin Regulation, 54.6% in favour
- Switzerland — 2005: Freedom of movement for workers, to include 10 new EU members, 56.0% in favour
- Switzerland — 2006: Cohesion contribution of one billion for the ten new member states of the EU, 53.4% in favour
- Switzerland — 2009: Freedom of movement for workers, to include two new EU members, 59.6% in favour
- Switzerland — 2009: Introduction of biometric passports, as required by the Schengen acquis, 50.1% in favour
- Switzerland — 2014: Freedom of movement for workers to be reduced, 50.3% in favour
- Switzerland — 2020: Termination of the 1999 Agreement on the Free Movement of Persons, 61.7% against

== Future referendums ==
=== Joining the EU ===
Countries which seek to join the European Union in the future may hold a referendum as part of the accession process.

In Armenia, a hearing in the National Assembly on 21 June 2024 was organized by the United Platform of Democratic Forces (UPDF), to consider holding a referendum on the submission of an application for EU membership. On 27 June 2024, the president of the National Assembly, Alen Simonyan, confirmed that Armenia's leadership wants the country to join the EU and that it will hold a referendum in the near future. Simonyan stated "Our society has made a decision to be part of the European Union" and "I think that sometime in the near future we will have this referendum and I am sure that our people will say yes". On 25 October 2024, the UPDF announced that over 60,000 signatures had been collected in a nation-wide petition called Eurovote, in which signatures were gathered in support of holding a referendum on Armenia's EU membership.

The constitution of France (Article 88-5) requires that any future treaty on the accession of new EU member states be approved in a referendum. Politicians in other existing member states have proposed referendums in their states, particularly with respect to the accession of Turkey.

=== Withdrawal from the EU ===
Similarly, there have been proposals by eurosceptic parties and movements across the EU on holding referendums on withdrawing from the EU, since the United Kingdom voted in favour of withdrawing in a 2016 referendum.

=== Unified Patent Court ===
Ratification by Ireland of the agreement establishing the Unified Patent Court requires approval in a referendum, which was originally planned for 2024 but subsequently postponed.

=== Association Agreement ===
Andorra is expected to hold a referendum on the Association Agreement it has negotiated with the EU.

== See also ==
- Potential enlargement of the European Union
