= Campaign Against an EU Constitution =

- Formation: 2005
- Type: NGO
- Headquarters: Dublin, Ireland

Campaign Against an EU Constitution (CAEUC) was a coalition left-wing political parties, organisations, trade unionists and individuals in Ireland, formed in 2005 to campaign against the anticipated European Union Constitution referendum. The Irish referendum on the issue did not materialise when the constitution was rejected in a constitutional referendum in France and a consultative referendum in the Netherlands (though it had previously been approved in Spain and in Luxembourg by referendums.)

The Campaign against the EU constitution remained in existence, and campaigned against the Treaty of Lisbon in Ireland in 2008, alongside Sinn Féin, Libertas and various pro-life groups, on both left and right. The constitutional amendment which was required to enable ratification of the treaty was rejected in the first referendum held in June 2008, but passed in the second referendum held in October 2009.

== Affiliates ==
Organisations affiliated to CAEUC included, Peace and Neutrality Alliance (PANA), People's Movement, Socialist Party, Sinn Féin, Irish Anti-War Movement, Workers' Party, éirígí, Irish Republican Socialist Party, Community & Workers Action Group, Irish Socialist Network, Socialist Workers Party as well as a number of individuals.

CAEUC also liaised with similar bodies in other European countries such as ATTAC in France and Austria.
