= Íñigo Méndez de Vigo =

Spanish aristocrat and politician

The Most Excellent Íñigo Méndez de Vigo 9th Baron of Claret OCIII OMC LH
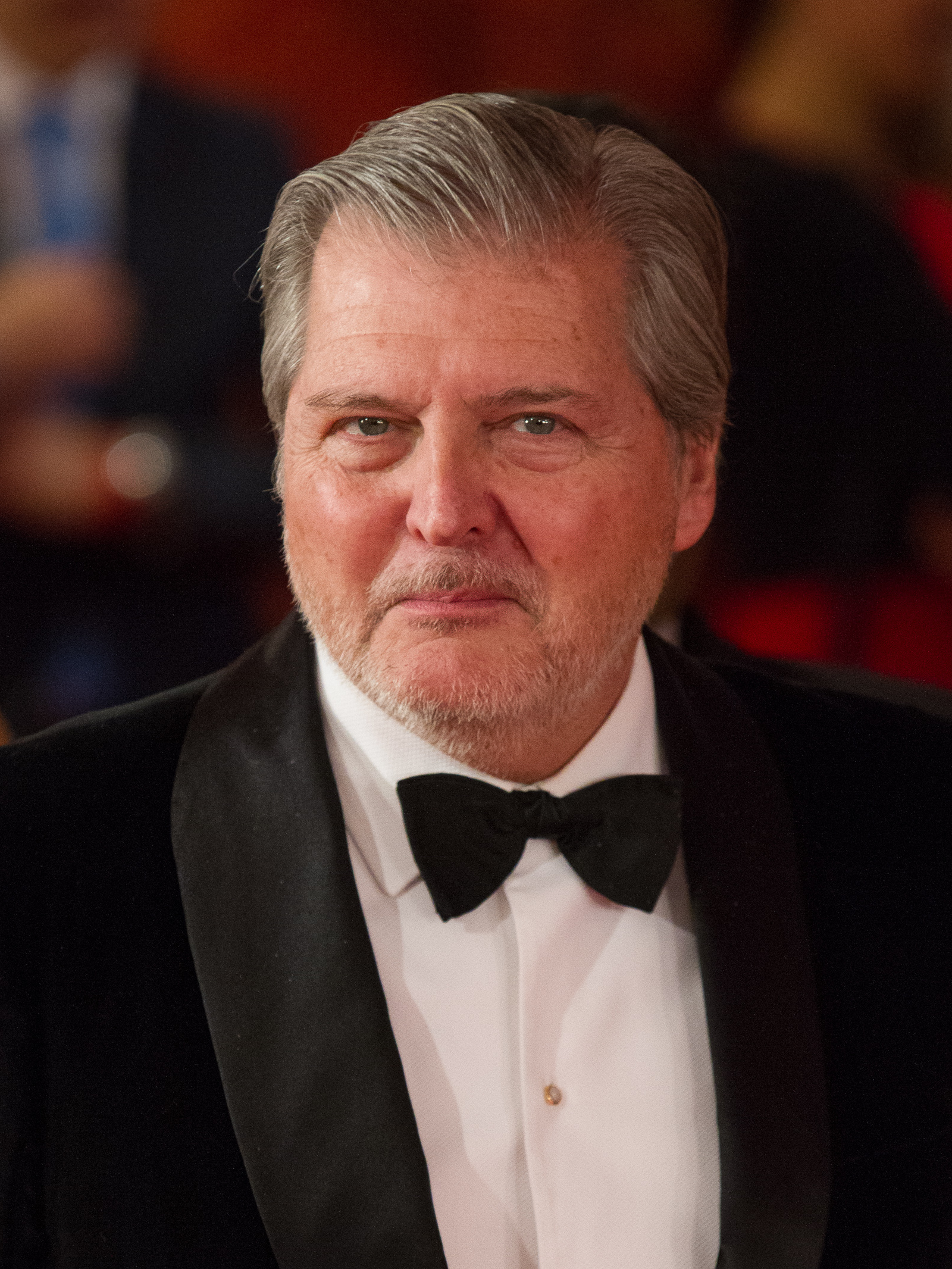
- Méndez de Vigo in 2018

Minister of Education, Culture and Sport of Spain
- In office 25 June 2015 – 7 June 2018
- Prime Minister: Mariano Rajoy
- Preceded by: José Ignacio Wert
- Succeeded by: Isabel Celaá (Minister of Education and Vocational Training); Màxim Huerta (Minister of Culture and Sport)

Spokesperson of the Government of Spain
- In office 4 November 2016 – 7 June 2018
- Preceded by: Soraya Sáenz de Santamaría
- Succeeded by: Isabel Celaá

Secretary of State for the European Union
- In office 23 December 2011 – 26 June 2015
- Preceded by: Diego López Garrido
- Succeeded by: Fernando Eguidazu Palacios

Member of the Congress of Deputies
- In office 13 January 2016 – 21 May 2019
- Constituency: Palencia

Member of the European Parliament
- In office 19 October 1992 – 23 December 2011
- Constituency: Spain

Personal details
- Born: Íñigo Méndez de Vigo Montojo; 21 January 1956 (age 70) Tetuan, Spanish Protectorate of Morocco
- Party: People's Party
- Spouse: María Pérez de Herrasti y Urquijo
- Occupation: Politician

Military service
- Branch: Army
- Service years: 1977–1980
- Rank: Lieutenant
- Unit: University Militias

Íñigo Méndez de Vigo y Montojo, 9th Baron of Claret (born 21 January 1956) is a Spanish politician. He was Minister of Education, Culture and Sport of Spain between 26 June 2015 and 1 June 2018, when a vote of no-confidence against Mariano Rajoy ousted the government. He was also the Spokesperson of the Government from 4 November 2016 until his departure on 1 June 2018.

== Childhood and education ==
Méndez de Vigo was born on 21 January 1956 in Tetuan, then part of the Spanish Protectorate of Morocco, where his father (descendant of the Minister of War Santiago Méndez de Vigo and his wife Ana Isabel Osorio y Zayas, Countess suo jure of Santa Cruz de los Manueles) was a lieutenant in the infantry. He is descended from the Marquesses of Cubas, the Dukes of Riánsares and Queen mother of Spain Maria Christina of the Two Sicilies (María Cristina de Borbón), and via his maternal grandmother, the novelist Carmen de Icaza, he succeeded, on 8 January 1981, to her title as 9th Baron de Claret. Íñigo Méndez de Vigo y Montojo is a fourth cousin once removed of Felipe VI through common descent from Queen Maria Cristina, Consort and later Regent of Spain.

Méndez de Vigo has a brother, Pedro, an army officer, and two sisters, Beatriz and Valeria, one of whom is the secretary general of the National Intelligence Center, and the other for a non-governmental organisation.

He completed his schooling at the German School in Madrid, as well as studying French language at the Académie française and learning English at the British Institute School. He graduated in law from the Universidad Complutense de Madrid in 1978.

Following the completion of his military service with the rank of lieutenant and after passing the public exams, he became legal advisor to the Cortes Generales in 1981.

He is married to María Pérez de Herrasti y Urquijo, since 8 January 2020 Marchioness of Albayda (with Grandeeship of Spain) and Marchioness of la Conquista.

== Career ==
=== Political career ===
In 1982, at the age of 26, Méndez de Vigo was appointed director of interparliamentary relations for the Cortes Generales. In 1984 he accepted the position of special advisor to then-secretary general of the Council of Europe, Marcelino Oreja.

He joined the People's Party at its founding Conference in 1989, and stood unsuccessfully in that year as one of its candidates at the European election.

In October 1992 he was elected a Member of the European Parliament, a position he held until December 2011. He also served as a member of the People's Party's National Steering Committee.

Méndez de Vigo served as the European People's Party co-ordinator on the Committee on Constitutional Affairs from 1994 and on its Committee on Economic and Monetary Affairs (2009–2011), as well as:

- Chairman of the EP Delegation to the Convention drafting the Charter of Fundamental Rights (1999–2000);
- Chairman of the EP Delegation to the European Convention (2003–04);
- EP representative to the IGC (2004);
- Parliament's rapporteur (with Richard Corbett MEP) on the Treaty establishing a European Constitution (2004);
- Parliament's rapporteur (with Richard Corbett MEP) on the Treaty of Lisbon.

Between 2006 and 2007, Méndez de Vigo served as member of the Amato Group, a group of high-level European politicians unofficially working on rewriting the Treaty establishing a Constitution for Europe into what became known as the Treaty of Lisbon following its rejection by French and Dutch voters. In 2009 he was appointed president of the College of Europe.

In December 2011 he joined Mariano Rajoy's first government as Secretary of State for the European Union. In June 2015 he was appointed Minister of Education, Culture and Sport in replacement of José Ignacio Wert. In November 2016, in the Second Rajoy Government, he was also appointed Spokesperson of the Government.

In March 2019 he left active politics.

=== Academic career ===
- Lecturer in constitutional law (UCM, 1981–1984)
  - Lecturer in community law (1989–1991)
- Jean Monnet Chair in European Institutions (UCM, 1999–2004)
  - Honorary Jean Monnet Chair (2004)

== Other activities ==
- Elcano Royal Institute for International and Strategic Studies, member of the board of trustees
- European Council on Foreign Relations (ECFR), member
- Thyssen-Bornemisza Museum, chairman of the board of trustees
- Museo Picasso Málaga, honorary member of the board of trustees
- Universal Forum of Cultures, honorary member of the board of trustees

== Publications ==
Méndez de Vigo has written numerous books and articles on Europe:

- Una Reforma Fiscal para España, with José Manuel García-Margallo (Ed. Lid, 1996)
- Financiación de las Comunidades Autónomas y Corresponsabilidad Fiscal, with José Manuel García-Margallo and Vicente Martínez-Pujalte (Fundación Bancaixa, 1996)
- La Apuesta Europea: de la moneda a la Unión Política, with José Manuel García-Margallo (Ed. Política Exterior, 1998)
- Europa paso a paso (2002)
- El rompecabezas. Así redactamos la Constitución europea (Ed. Biblioteca Nueva and Real Instituto Elcano, 2005)
- ¿Por qué una Constitución para Europa? 25 respuestas, with Marcelino Oreja and Juan Antonio Carrillo Salcedo (Ed. Real Academia de Ciencias Morales y Políticas, 2005)
- Alegato por Europa (Ed. Biblioteca nueva, 2006)
- Coordinator: ¿Qué fue de la Constitución europea? (Ed. Planeta, 2007)
- Editor: Liber Amicorum Marcelino Oreja Aguirre (Ed. Cinterco, 2010)

Méndez de Vigo also writes for ABC, and is an online contributor for El Economista.

== Titles, honours and awards ==
=== Titles ===
- 9th Baron of Claret (1981–present)
- Consort of the Marchioness of Albayda (2020–present)
- Consort of the Marchioness of la Conquista (2020–present)
- Consort of the Countess of Antillón (2021–present)
- Consort of the Countess of Padul (2021–present)

=== Honours ===
- 2001: Grand Cross of the Order of Civil Merit of Spain
- 2008: Grand Officer of the Order of the Star of Italian Solidarity
- 2010: Grand Cross of the Order of Merit of the Federal Republic of Germany
- 2011: Knight of the Legion of Honour of the French Republic
- 2011: Medal of the Spanish Order of Constitutional Merit
- 2018: Grand Cross of the Order of Charles III of Spain

=== Awards ===
- 1999: Salvador de Madariaga European Journalism Prize
- 2001: Silver Medal of the Royal Institute of European Studies
- 2002: Medal of Honour of the Sociedad General de Autores y Editores
- 2002: Gold Medal of the Foundation of European Merit
- 2003: Prize to the MEP of the year by the Association of Parliamentary Journalists
- 2007: Gold Medal of the Committees of Action for European Union
- 2009: Prix Capalbio – European Special Award

=== Arms ===
Coat of arms of Íñigo Méndez de Vigo
Coronet Coronet of a Baron Orders Order of Charles III collar

Academic offices
Preceded by Helle Thorning-Schmidt	Speaker at the College of Europe Opening Ceremony; 2013	Succeeded by Mariano Rajoy
