= Otto Schily =

Federal Minister of the Interior of Germany from 1998 to 2005

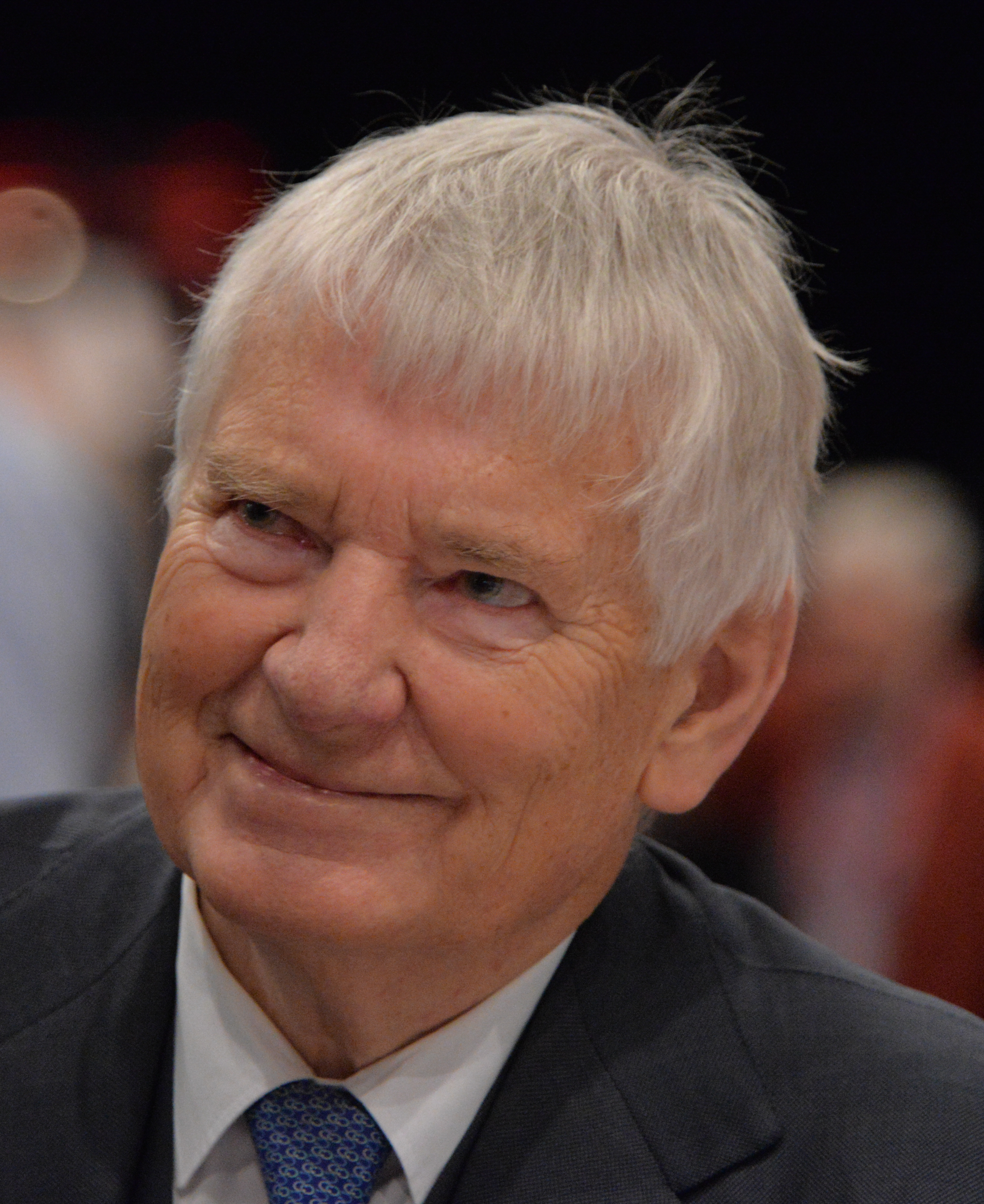
- Schily in 2015

Minister of the Interior
- In office 27 October 1998 – 22 November 2005
- Chancellor: Gerhard Schröder
- Preceded by: Manfred Kanther
- Succeeded by: Wolfgang Schäuble

Leader of The Greens in the Bundestag
- In office 29 March 1983 – 3 April 1984 Serving with Marieluise Beck and Petra Kelly
- Chief Whip: Joschka Fischer
- Preceded by: Office established
- Succeeded by: Antje Vollmer

Member of the Bundestag for Bavaria
- In office 2 December 1990 – 27 September 2009
- Constituency: Social Democratic Party List

Member of the Bundestag for North Rhine-Westphalia
- In office 25 January 1987 – 7 November 1989
- Preceded by: The Greens List
- In office 6 March 1983 – 13 March 1986
- Constituency: The Greens List

Personal details
- Born: Otto Georg Schily; 20 July 1932 (age 94) Bochum, Germany
- Party: Social Democratic Party (1989–present); The Greens (1980–1989)
- Education: LMU Munich; University of Hamburg; Free University of Berlin

Otto Georg Schily (born 20 July 1932) is a former Federal Minister of the Interior of Germany, his tenure was from 1998 to 2005, in the cabinet of Chancellor Gerhard Schröder. He is a member of the Social Democratic Party of Germany (SPD) and was a founding member of the West-German Green Party.

== Early life and education ==
Born in Bochum as the son of an iron works director, Schily grew up in a family of anthroposophists. His younger brother is Konrad Schily, an academic and also a politician. They spent their adolescence during the war in Bavaria. The family opposed Adolf Hitler. In 1962, he passed his second state exam after having studied law and politics in Munich, Hamburg, and Berlin, thus being admitted to the bar; a year later, he opened his own law practice.

On 2 June 1967 Schily went to a demonstration in Berlin against the violation of human rights in Iran. A student, Benno Ohnesorg, was shot dead by the police. He subsequently decided to represent the student's family.

In the 1970s, he became a public figure as a trial lawyer, defending several guerrilla activists of the left-wing Red Army Faction. In 1971, he represented his friend Horst Mahler, who much later would become an advocate of the fascist National Democratic Party. During the Stammheim trial (1975–1977), he was the only remaining attorney of Gudrun Ensslin. While he gained popularity and respect for acting according to his own moral principles, some accused him of supporting the radicals' goals.

== Political career ==
=== Founding member of the Green Party ===
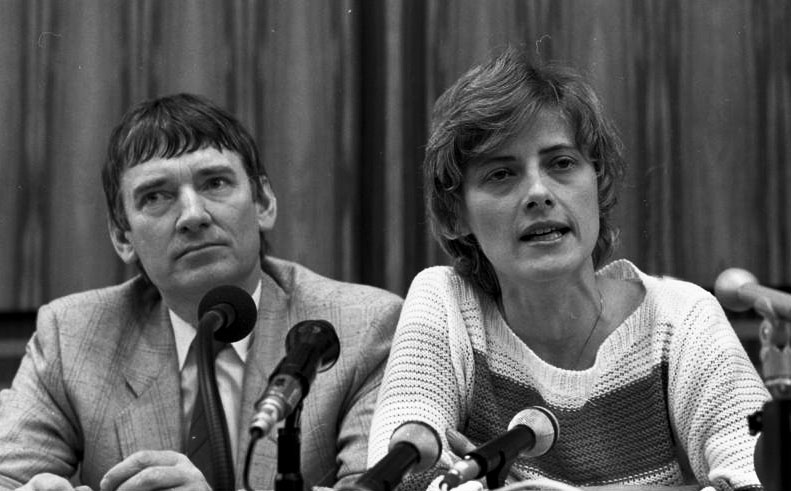
Petra Kelly and Otto Schily after the 1983 federal election

In 1980, Schily became founding member of the Green Party. In 1982, he joined other members of the Green Party for a meeting with Libyan leader Muammar Gaddafi, who offered to help groups allied with the European anti-nuclear movement to try to close United States military bases in Europe.

In the 1983 elections, Schily was elected to the German Bundestag and in the first electoral term in which the Greens were represented in parliament, he was one of the spokespersons of the parliamentary group, together with Petra Kelly and Marieluise Beck. In parliament, he became a leading exponent of the party's realist wing, which favored striving for a governing coalition with the Social Democrats following the 1987 elections. In 1986, he was the Greens' sole representative on a Bundestag committee investigating the so-called Flick affair. Due to the party's policy of rotating its representatives, he had to leave parliament in 1986, but he was re-elected in 1987.

=== Switch to the Social Democrats ===
Increasingly estranged from the fundamentalist wing of the Greens, particularly regarding alliances with larger parties, Schily left the party in 1989, resigned his seat in parliament, and joined the Social Democrats (SPD) instead – which he represented in the new Bundestag in 1990. In subsequent years, he was active in affairs of the former East Germany and in coordinating various legal policies of the SPD. Between 1994 and 1998, Schily served on the Committee on the Election of Judges (Wahlausschuss), which is in charge of appointing judges to the Federal Constitutional Court of Germany. He was also a member of the parliamentary body in charge of appointing judges to the Highest Courts of Justice, namely the Federal Court of Justice (BGH), the Federal Administrative Court (BVerwG), the Federal Fiscal Court (BFH), the Federal Labour Court (BAG), and the Federal Social Court (BSG).

=== Federal Minister of the Interior, 1998–2005 ===
After Gerhard Schröder became chancellor in 1998, he appointed Schily as Federal Minister of the Interior. He was the oldest member of the cabinet.

During his time in office, Schily was frequently criticized for conservative policies, such as pushing through German anti-terrorist legislation after the 11 September 2001 terrorist attacks, which were seen as contradictory to his earlier beliefs. Under the new legislation, his ministry moved against Metin Kaplan’s radical Islamic group in December 2001, banning it and 19 associated organizations and carrying out more than 200 raids in seven cities.

Between 2001 and 2004, Schily led the government’s negotiations with the conservative opposition on a bill that made it easier for skilled workers to move to Germany but toughened controls on foreign militants. In 2004, he joined Italy in proposing the creation of the camps, possibly in Libya, to process potential immigrants and repatriate illegal arrivals to the EU.

In 2001, the parliamentary opposition called for Schily’s resignation in light of revelations that his ministry had failed to inform the Federal Constitutional Court that a key witness in the government’s petition to ban the far-right National Democratic Party (NPD) had worked as an undercover agent for the domestic intelligence service; the failure to notify the court later resulted in the suspension of the proceedings.

In 2005, Schily again came under pressure for authorizing a raid on the newsroom of Cicero magazine after it had published information from a secret Federal Criminal Police Office (BKA) report.

On 29 March 2007, Schily took responsibility for the handling of the case of Guantanamo detainee Murat Kurnaz, who was arrested in Pakistan in 2001, turned over to United States authorities and held at the U.S. prison camp in Cuba as a terror suspect. Kurnaz was released in 2006 and returned to Germany.

Following the 2005 elections and the formation of the new government of Chancellor of Germany Angela Merkel, Schily was succeeded in his post by Wolfgang Schäuble. Schily remained a member of parliament until 2009 and served on the Committee on Foreign Affairs. In 2008, he caused headlines when the German Bundestag on 22 April fined him €22,000 for failing to disclose the names of his law firm’s clients. Otto Schily opposed compulsory vaccination as unconstitutional in an article in Die Welt.

== Life after politics ==
After serving as a minister, Schily became a supervisory board member of two companies for biometric technologies, raising questions as to whether or not he was capitalizing on his work as minister, regarding the implementation of biometric passports.

Between 2006 and 2007, Schily served as member of the Amato Group, a group of high-level European politicians unofficially working on rewriting the Treaty establishing a Constitution for Europe into what became known as the Treaty of Lisbon following its rejection by French and Dutch voters.

In 2015, Schily was accused of receiving money to lobby for the prosecution in Austria of Rakhat Aliyev, a former Kazakh official who turned against the Kazakh government.

In addition, Schily has held various paid and unpaid positions, including the following:

- Deloitte Germany, Member of the Advisory Board
- Schengen White List Project, Member of the Advisory Board
- Hertha BSC Foundation, Member of the Board of Trustees
- Investcorp, Member of the European Advisory Board (since 2006)
- Ziegert Bank- und Immobilienconsulting, Member of the Advisory Board
- DAPD News Agency, Member of the Advisory Board (2011-2012)
- 2006 FIFA World Cup Organizing Committee, Member of the Supervisory Board (2005-2006)

== Recognition ==
In 2005, Schily received the Leo Baeck Medal for his humanitarian work promoting tolerance and social justice.

== See also ==
- Politics of Germany
- Order of the Oak Crown

== Bibliography ==
- German Historic Museum biography of Otto Schily (in German)
- Portrait in the Financial Times Deutschland (in German)
