= Amato Group =

EU committee that drafted the 2007 Treaty of Lisbon

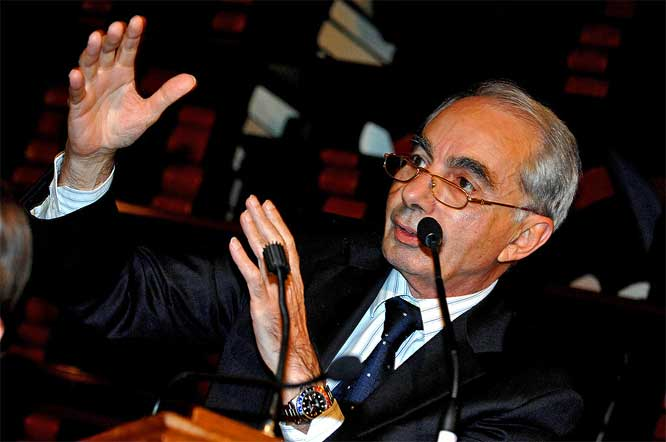
Former Italian prime minister Giuliano Amato lead the group.

The Amato Group, officially the Action Committee for European Democracy (ACED) was a group of high-level European politicians unofficially working, over 2006–2007, on rewriting the Treaty establishing a Constitution for Europe into what became known as the Treaty of Lisbon (December 2007) following the earlier treaty's rejection, in 2005, by referendums in France and the Netherlands.

Led by Giuliano Amato (thus the group's unofficial name), a former Prime Minister of Italy who was also Vice-President of the original European Convention, the group was backed by the Barroso Commission, who sent two representatives, the commissioners Danuta Hübner (regional policy) and Margot Wallström (communications).

== Members ==
The group consisted of 16 members from 14 member states of the European Union, including one current European Commissioner:

Name	Member state	Reason for inclusion (detail at time of ACED)
Giuliano Amato	Italy	former Prime Minister of Italy and Vice-President of the former European Convention (which created a previous Draft Treaty establishing a Constitution for Europe)
Michel Barnier	France	former French Foreign Minister, former European Commissioner for Regional Policy
Stefan Collignon (de)	Germany	Professor and political economist
Jean-Luc Dehaene	Belgium	former Prime Minister of Belgium and Vice-President of the former European Convention
Danuta Hübner	European Union (from Poland)	European Commissioner for Regional Policy
Sandra Kalniete	Latvia	former European Commissioner for Agriculture, Rural Development and Fisheries
Wim Kok	Netherlands	former Prime Minister of the Netherlands
Paavo Lipponen	Finland	former Prime Minister of Finland
János Martonyi	Hungary	former Hungarian Foreign Minister
Inigo Mendez de Vigo	Spain	Member of the European Parliament
Chris Patten	United Kingdom	former European Commissioner for External Relations
Otto Schily	Germany	former German Interior Minister
Costas Simitis	Greece	former Prime Minister of Greece
Dominique Strauss-Kahn	France	former French Minister of the Economy, Finance and Industry
António Vitorino	Portugal	former European Commissioner for Justice and Home Affairs
Margot Wallström	European Union (from Sweden)	Vice-President of the European Commission

== Resulting text ==
The group first met in Rome on 30 September 2006. On 4 June 2007 they released the completed draft text. The size of the text is cut from 63,000 words in 448 articles in the Treaty establishing a Constitution for Europe (EU Constitution) to 12,800 in 70 articles in the proposed text of a new EU-treaty. The sized down text came from including only the innovations contained in the third part of the EU Constitution – which essentially ties together former EU treaties – and putting them into additional protocols. The two protocols would be attached to the existing Treaty on the European Union and the Treaty Establishing the European Community.

The text stripped the rejected constitution of its constitutional elements, including the article on the EU's symbols and the controversial "God-less" preamble, reduced the Charter of Fundamental Rights to one legally binding article and foresees a new name for new EU foreign policy chief, called 'Union foreign minister' in the Constitution.

=== Structure of the new treaty ===
The new treaty would not include everything in a single document, as the Constitution would do, but rather:

- Replace the Treaty on European Union (TEU, or Maastricht Treaty) with the text of the new treaty, which roughly corresponds with Part I and Part IV of the European Constitution. The nine titles of Part I of the European Constitution are literally taken over as titles I to IX of the new TEU (except for three modifications, see below). Title X is a new title that contains two short articles referring to the Treaty establishing the European Community (see next point) and two articles originally from Part IV of the Constitution regarding two simplified revision procedures. Title XI is similar to the rest of Part IV of the Constitution.
- Amend the Treaty establishing the European Community (TEC, or Treaty of Rome) to have most provisions of Part III of the European Constitution included in the treaty, including the single legal personality of the Union and the suppression of the pillar structure. In order to avoid any legal confusion, the words "European Community" would be replaced by "European Union" in the text of the TEC. The Intergovernmental Conference agreeing on the new treaty may also decide to rename the treaty (to Treaty establishing the European Union for example), like has been done before by the Maastricht Treaty. The Treaty establishing the European Community is to be amended by means of two protocols attached to the new treaty:
  - A Protocol on the Functioning of the Union, containing institutional changes;
  - A Protocol on the Development of the Union's Policies in Order to Meet the Challenges of the XXI Century, containing the innovations of the European Constitution.
- Refer to the existing Charter of Fundamental Rights of the European Union in article 8 of the new TEU, whereby it becomes legally binding. Article I-9 of the European Constitution referred to Part II of the Constitution in a similar manner. The charter will be updated to the version included in Part II of the European Constitution, which slightly differs from the original charter.

As a result, the new TEU defines the framework of the European Union, whereas the amended TEC defines in detail the law and decision making procedures, what the policy areas of the Union are, and which law or decision making procedure should be followed in a certain policy area. Both treaties would have the same legal value, as is the case with the current TEU and TEC. Furthermore, the Charter of Fundamental Rights would have the same legal value as the new TEU and the amended TEC.

=== Differences between the new TEU and the European Constitution ===
Titles I to IX of the new TEU are literally taken over from Part I of the European Constitution, with only the following modifications:

- The preamble of the European Constitution, as well as Article I-1 (Establishment of the Union) and Article I-8 (The symbols of the Union), are not taken over as such, because of their constitutional character. Article 1 of the new treaty would instead be similar to Article 1 of the current Treaty on European Union. The rather long preamble of the European Constitution would be replaced by a sentence explaining the need for a new treaty, and possibly referring to the Berlin Declaration of March 27, 2007.
- An additional paragraph is added to section 1 of Article 8 of the new TEU (was Article I-9 of the European Constitution), which states that with the entry into force of the new Treaty, the Charter of Fundamental Rights will become legally binding.
- References to other articles in the original text of the European Constitution are replaced by references to the new places of the articles, i.e. in the new TEU, in the amended TEC, or in the Charter of Fundamental Rights.

Furthermore, the article concerning the Union Minister for Foreign Affairs is maintained in the new TEU (Article I-28 of the European Constitution, Article 27 of the new treaty), but the Amato Group has stated it has no problem with a name change.

== See also ==
- Treaty establishing a Constitution for Europe
- Treaty of Lisbon
- Action Committee for the United States of Europe
