= Portuguese European Constitution referendum =

The Portuguese referendum on the Treaty establishing a Constitution for Europe was a planned referendum to be held on October 9, 2005 to decide whether the Portugal should ratify the proposed Constitution of the European Union.

On 12 March 2005, the Prime Minister José Sócrates said that he would seek to have the Constitution of Portugal amended to allow that a referendum be held on October 9, 2005 alongside the municipal elections taking place at that time. The agreement between the two main parties was made on 1 June 2005.

According to the Portuguese Constitution, the result of the referendum is binding if more than of half of registered voters turn out. The text was to have been revised in June 2005 with the express purpose of allowing the referendum to be held on the same day as the municipal elections. This was the second time the Portuguese Constitution has been revised because of the European Constitution, as the original version did not allow referendums on international treaties.

Following the rejection of the European Constitution by voters in France in May 2005 and in the Netherlands in June 2005, and the extension granted to the ratification deadline, José Sócrates announced on 17 June 2005 that the government would postpone the referendum.

== Initial plans and delay ==
The referendum was initially scheduled for April 2005 using the question "Do you agree with the Charter of Fundamental Rights, the rule of qualified majority voting and the new institutional framework of the EU, as defined by the European Constitution?", since Portugal's Constitution does not allow the text of a treaty to be put on a referendum directly.

However, in December 2004, the Constitutional Court of Portugal rejected the proposed question, deeming it unclear. This resulted in the delay to the whole process, as a constitutional amendment would be required before allowing a referendum on the treaty itself.
