= 2025 Slovenian NATO membership referendum =

Non-binding referendum on one question

A one question non-binding referendum was proposed be held in Slovenia in 2025 regarding Slovenia's NATO membership.

On 18 July 2025, the Slovenian Parliament voted to annul the decision to hold a referendum.

== Background ==
At the start of July 2025, the National Assembly passed a proposal to increase defense spending to 3% of GDP, with the support of the Left, a partner of Prime Minister Robert Golob's Freedom Movement, as well as the opposition. Golob's party voted no, as he had agreed to increase defence spending to 5% at a NATO summit in the Hague the month prior to meet the new spending goal for members of the alliance. Golob subsequently called for a referendum, claiming that "there are only two possible paths: either we remain in the alliance and pay the membership fee, or we leave the alliance".

== Opinion polls ==
A 2025 poll found that support for NATO membership was 52%, compared to the 66% of Slovenians who voted for NATO membership in a referendum in 2003.

== See also ==
- Member states of NATO
- 2003 Slovenian European Union and NATO membership referendum
