= Danish European Constitution referendum =

The Danish referendum on the Treaty establishing a Constitution for Europe was a planned referendum to be held on 27 September 2005, that would have put the proposed Constitution to the voters of Denmark for ratification. However, after voters voted down the Constitution in both the French and Dutch referendums before the Danish vote could take place, Danish prime minister Anders Fogh Rasmussen indicated that the referendum would be cancelled. On 24 April 2008 the Danish parliament ratified the Treaty's successor, the Treaty of Lisbon, without a referendum.

A November 2004 opinion poll indicated that 49% of Danes were expected to vote in favour of the Constitution, with 26% opposing.

== Positions of political parties ==
Most political parties in the Danish Parliament, the Folketing, supported the European constitution with the exception of the Danish People's Party and the Red-Green Alliance. These two parties together held 30 seats out of 179 in the Parliament.
