= Referendum bill =

A referendum bill is a bill (proposed law) that puts forth a call for a referendum

- Independence referendum bill
  - 2014 Scottish independence referendum
  - 1995 Quebec referendum's bill that established the referendum law
  - 1980 Quebec referendum's bill that established the referendum law
- European Union (Referendum) Bill 2013–14, of the United Kingdom
- Daylight Saving for South East Queensland Referendum Act 2010
- Czech European Constitution referendum bill
