= Irish European Constitution referendum =

Proposed referendum on the Treaty establishing a Constitution for Europe

The Irish referendum on the Treaty establishing a Constitution for Europe was a vote that was planned but did not occur. The referendum was expected to take place in 2005 or 2006 to decide whether Ireland should ratify the proposed EU Constitution. Following the rejection of the Constitution by voters in the French referendum of May 2005 and the Dutch referendum of June 2005, the planned Irish referendum was postponed indefinitely.

The government of Ireland signed the "Treaty establishing a Constitution for Europe" on 29 October 2004. However the ratification of major EU treaties, starting with the Single European Act of 1986, requires the amendment of Article 29 of the Constitution of Ireland, which prescribes the extent to which Irish law can be superseded by other laws, including EU law. Amendments of the Constitution of Ireland can only be approved by referendum.

A TNS/MRBI Irish Times opinion poll on 14 June 2005 showed that while 45% of voters wished to see a referendum, only 30% would vote yes in the constitutional referendum, with 35% voting no and 35% unsure.

The then government parties of Fianna Fáil and the Progressive Democrats were in favour of a yes vote. Fine Gael, the main opposition party was also in favour of a yes vote. The Labour Party, like the French Socialist Party, was divided, with its parliamentary leadership supporting ratification but its youth wing calling for a rejection. The other left-wing parties were calling for a no vote, including Sinn Féin, the Socialist Party and the Socialist Workers Party. The Green Party was split on the text and a special convention to determine its position was called off after the Dutch and French 'no' votes.

== Lisbon Treaty ==
The rejection of the Constitution by French and Dutch voters halted the ratification process. As support by all members was required the Constitution was dropped and in July 2007 the European Council agreed upon the foundation of a new treaty to replace the rejected Constitution. The text agreed upon at the European Council meeting on 18 and 19 October 2007 contained many of the planned changes of the Constitution but would not replace the existing treaties, as the Constitution would have done, but amended them. Before this Reform Treaty of Lisbon was signed on 13 December 2007 Valéry Giscard d'Estaing explained this in an article "La boîte à outils du traité de Lisbonne" in Le Monde of 26 October 2007. An English version "The EU Treaty is the same as the Constitution" appeared in The Independent of 30 October 2007. The articles contained the following:

"le traité de Lisbonne se situe exactement dans la ligne des traités d'Amsterdam et de Nice, ignorés du grand public. [...] Il est illisible pour les citoyens [...] les propositions institutionnelles du traité constitutionnel [...] se retrouvent intégralement dans le traité de Lisbonne, mais dans un ordre différent, et insérés dans les traités antérieurs"
"The Treaty of Lisbon is thus a catalogue of amendments. It is unpenetrable for the public. In terms of content, the proposed institutional reforms are all to be found in the Treaty of Lisbon. They have merely been ordered differently and split up between previous treaties."

Anti-Lisbon Treaty campaigners like Declan Ganley and Patricia McKenna quoted Giscard differently: "Public opinion will be led to adopt, without knowing it, the proposals that we dare not present to them directly" ... "All the earlier proposals will be in the new text, but will be hidden and disguised in some way." To the Irish Times Giscard complained the full quote should have read: "The latest brainwave is to preserve part of the innovations of the constitutional treaty, but hide them by breaking them up into several texts. The most innovative provisions would become simple amendments to the treaties of Maastricht and Nice. The technical improvements would be regrouped in a colourless, harmless treaty. The texts would be sent to national parliaments, which would vote separately. Thus public opinion would be led to adopt, without knowing it, the provisions that we dare not present directly. This process of 'dividing to ratify' is obviously unworthy of the challenge at stake. It may be a good magician's act. But it will confirm European citizens in the idea that the construction of Europe is organised behind their backs by lawyers and diplomats".

The first referendum on the Treaty of Lisbon held on 12 June 2008 was rejected by the Irish electorate, by a margin of 53.4% to 46.6%, with a turnout of 53%.

The second referendum on the Treaty of Lisbon held on 2 October 2009 and the proposal was approved by 67.1% to 32.9%, with a turnout of 59%.
