= Czech European Constitution referendum =

The Czech referendum on the Treaty establishing a Constitution for Europe was expected to take place in 2006 to decide whether the Czech Republic should ratify the proposed Constitution of the European Union. Following the rejection of the Constitution by voters in France and the Netherlands, the Czech government announced that the proposed referendum would not be held.

The Czech Social Democrats, Christian Democrats and Green Party were strongly in favour of European integration, and campaigned in support of the proposed Constitution, but President Václav Klaus was an outspoken eurosceptic, and refused to sign the constitutional treaty in October 2004 (most countries, however, did not send their head of state to sign). Opposition Civic Democratic Party opposed the Constitution. The referendum was expected to be legally binding on the government.

== Referendum bill ==
On 9 March 2005, the Czech government approved a bill that would permit referendums to be called on fundamental issues relating to the country's internal and foreign policy, and be called by any of the following:

- A petition containing at least half a million signatures of Czech citizens.
- Two thirds of the members in either chamber of the bicameral Czech parliament.
- The government itself.

It is as yet uncertain whether the bill will pass. The opposition Civic Democratic Party has objected to the idea of referendums becoming a usual part of the Czech political system, and has instead motioned its own bill on a one-off referendum on the European Constitution.

If both bills fail to gather enough support, then it's quite possible that no referendum will be held and the matter of the ratification will be decided by the Czech parliament instead (where supporters of constitution do not have sufficient number of votes to accept the constitution, as of middle of 2005).

== Opinion polling ==
Date	Agency	For	Against
2–10 April 2007	STEM	40	57
24 March 2007	Open Europe	27%	49%
1–6 June 2005	STEM	48%	52%
2 June 2005	Factum Invenio	31.5%	33.7%
18–25 April 2005	CVVM	41%	33%
October - November 2004	TNS Opinion	63%	18%
