= Penelope Project =

'Penelope' was the code word given to a draft text of the EU Constitution prepared for the President of the European Commission, Romano Prodi, in 2001. The text was named after Penelope, the wife of Odysseus in Greek Mythology, who was perpetually spinning a web which she never completed.

== History ==
After the creation of the European Single Currency, the European Commission proposed that the EU should have a single constitution to replace the existing ad hoc system of multilateral treaties. The Convention on the Future of Europe, or the European Convention, was created by the European Council in December 2001 in order to propose a draft constitution for the European Union.

The Commission wanted to create an expanded system of Qualified Majority Voting to allow for more expediency in decision making.

In a speech in Strasbourg in May 2002, Romano Prodi stated that the proposed reforms had a further intention: 'As regards the institutions, our proposals have a clear aim: to define more clearly who does what in the European Union. In other words, who is accountable politically and institutionally for action undertaken.' (emphasis in original)

However, while the European Convention did agree on a possible Constitution, it did not follow the Commission proposals. According to a 2005 review of the treaty reform process:

"Valéry Giscard d’Estaing, the chair of the Praesidium, made clear at an early stage his lack of sympathy for the Commission and for its President’s ambition that it should become the government of Europe, suggesting that it had served purpose in establishing the single market."

== Time line ==
The European Commission presented two communications to the Convention in 2002 laying out its policy preferences for a future constitution. These communications left out discussion of the architecture of European institutions until after the 2002 Irish Referendum on the Treaty of Nice.

Prodi signalled his intention to influence the 'listening phase' of the Treaty consultations by creating the 'Penelope Group', "a small group of senior officials to prepare a draft Constitution (European Commission, 2002c), for the Commission to approve and submit to the Convention in the beginning of the ‘drafting phase’."

However, the existence of the Penelope Group led to a disagreement with Valéry Giscard D'Estaing, the chair of the Convention, who saw it as undermining his work. Secondly, "the ‘Penelope’ draft was leaked to Le Monde and newspapers in Germany, Italy and Spain only hours before the official December document (European Commission, 2002b) was approved by the college (Norman, 2003, 165). The appearance of two texts, virtually simultaneously, seriously undermined the commission's credibility, even if there was little difference in their substance."

The Penelope Project document was seen by critics as an attempt to increase the importance and power of the Commission relative to the Parliament and Council, but the outcome of the treaty process saw the creation of the office of President of the European Union, rather than increasing the powers of the President of the commission.
