= List of presidents of College of Europe =

The President of the Administrative Council of the College of Europe chairs its highest decision-making authority, and is responsible for the implementation of the College’s objectives. The Council includes representatives of the European Commission, of the two countries hosting campuses in Bruges, Belgium and Natolin, Poland and of other European governments. The Executive Committee of the College, reporting to the Administrative Council, ensures the sound financial and administrative working of the College.

== List of Presidents ==
- Salvador de Madariaga (1950–1964)
- Jean Rey (1964–1974)
- François-Xavier Ortoli (1974–1985)
- Daniël Coens (1985–1990)
- Manuel Marín (1990–1995)
- Jacques Delors (1995–2000)
- Jean-Luc Dehaene (2000–2009)
- Iñigo Méndez de Vigo (2009–2019)
- Herman Van Rompuy (2019–present)

== Sources ==
- Book: The College of Europe. Fifty years of service to Europe, College of Europe publications. 2001.
