= 1994 Finnish European Union membership referendum =

- 16 October 1994
- Should Finland become a member of the European Union in accordance with the negotiated agreement (accession agreement)?

Results
Choice	Votes	%
Yes	1,620,726	56.89%
No	1,228,261	43.11%
Valid votes	2,848,987	99.55%
Invalid or blank votes	12,854	0.45%
Total votes	2,861,841	100.00%
Registered voters/turnout	4,042,607	70.79%
- Results by electoral district

An advisory referendum on joining the European Union was held in Finland on 16 October 1994. 56.9% of voters approved of the proposal, with a voter turnout of 70.8%. Due to having its own customs jurisdiction, a separate referendum was held in Åland a month later, and was also approved.

As of 2026, this was the most recent referendum in Finland.

== Party policies ==
Position	Political parties
Yes	Centre Party
Yes	Social Democratic Party
Yes	National Coalition Party
Yes	Swedish People's Party of Finland
Yes	Liberal People's Party
No	Finnish Rural Party
No	Finnish Christian League
Neutral	Left Alliance
Neutral	Green League

== Results ==
Choice	Votes	%
Yes	1,620,726	56.89
No	1,228,261	43.11
Total	2,848,987	100.00
Valid votes	2,848,987	99.55
Invalid/blank votes	12,854	0.45
Total votes	2,861,841	100.00
Registered voters/turnout	4,042,607	70.79
Source: European Election Database

=== By region ===
Region	For		Against		Invalid/ blank	Total	Registered/ voters	Turnout
Region	Votes	%	Votes	%	Invalid/ blank	Total	Registered/ voters	Turnout
Åland^{[a]}	5,885	51.95	5,444	48.05	154	11,483	18,752	61.24
Central Finland	66,813	47.56	73,663	52.44	586	141,062	195,490	72.16
Central Ostrobothnia	17,036	42.75	22,815	57.25	174	40,025	52,361	76.44
Eastern Uusimaa	30,760	63.46	17,708	36.54	240	48,708	64,545	75.46
Kainuu	18,016	35.55	32,663	64.45	201	50,880	71,862	70.80
Kymenlaakso	72,173	66.23	36,807	33.77	459	109,439	150,492	72.72
Lapland	51,117	47.42	56,675	52.28	413	108,205	149,718	72.27
North Karelia	42,919	47.99	46,516	52.01	374	89,809	134,302	66.87
Northern Ostrobothnia	82,658	46.02	96,961	53.98	832	180,451	249,932	72.20
North Savo	65,127	48.21	69,960	51.79	501	135,588	197,171	68.77
Ostrobothnia	50,318	50.76	48,817	49.24	568	99,703	129,832	76.79
Päijät-Häme	68,596	61.94	42,147	38.06	478	111,221	152,136	73.11
Pirkanmaa	134,719	54.77	111,248	45.23	1,213	247,180	330,297	74.84
Satakunta	70,541	50.48	69,192	49.52	667	140,400	189,002	74.28
South Karelia	49,722	63.62	28,432	36.38	330	78,484	109,178	71.89
Southern Ostrobothnia	43,945	38.94	68,910	61.06	417	113,272	150,585	75.22
South Savo	49,268	54.48	41,167	45.52	381	90,816	133,861	67.84
Southwest Finland	140,209	56.62	107,422	43.38	1,170	248,801	330,644	75.25
Kanta-Häme	53,125	56.89	40,258	43.11	514	93,897	126,245	74.38
Uusimaa	493,811	70.83	203,333	29.17	3,117	700,261	899,718	77.83
Overseas	13,968	63.23	8,123	36.77	65	22,156	206,484	10.73
Total	1,620,726	56.89	1,228,261	43.11	12,854	2,861,841	4,042,607	70.79
Source: European Election Database

^{a} A separate referendum was also held in the Åland Islands as it was a separate customs jurisdiction.
