= 1994 Ålandic European Union membership referendum =

1994 referendum in Åland

- 20 November 1994

Results
Choice	Votes	%
Yes	6,456	73.64%
No	2,311	26.36%

A referendum on European Union membership was held in Åland, Finland on 20 November 1994. Although a nationwide referendum had been held in Finland (in which the islands had also participated) on 16 October, the islands held another separate vote as they were a separate customs jurisdiction. EU membership was approved by 74% of voters.

== Results ==
Choice	Votes	%
For	6,456	73.64
Against	2,311	26.36
Total	8,767	100.00
Registered voters/turnout	18,090	–
Source: Direct Democracy
