= 1994 Austrian European Union membership referendum =

- 12 June 1994
- Shall the National Council's decision of 5 May 1994 on the Constitutional law concerning the Accession of Austria to the European Union be enacted as law?
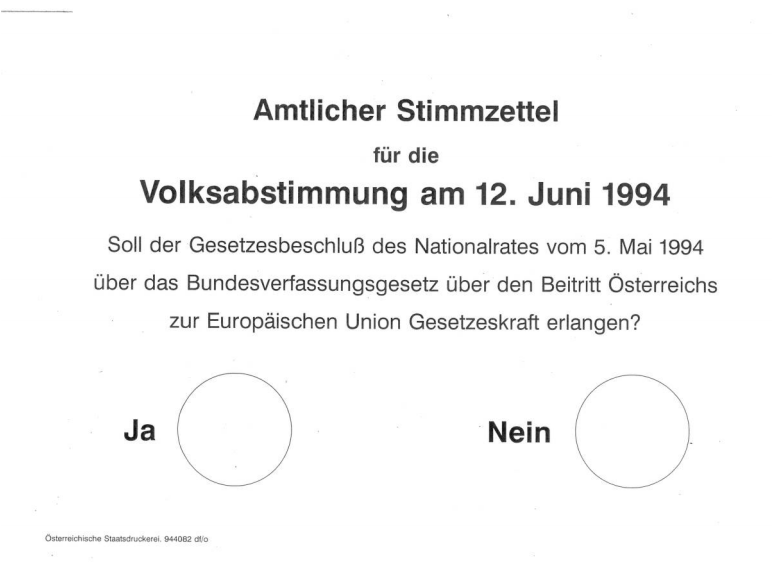
- Official ballot paper for the referendum

Results
Choice	Votes	%
Yes	3,145,981	66.58%
No	1,578,850	33.42%
Valid votes	4,724,831	99.09%
Invalid or blank votes	43,570	0.91%
Total votes	4,768,401	100.00%
Registered voters/turnout	5,790,578	82.35%
Referendum result by states.
Yes	No

A referendum on European Union membership was held in Austria on 12 June 1994. The question asked was "Shall the National Council's decision of 5 May 1994 on the Constitutional law (Bundesverfassungsgesetz) concerning the Accession of Austria to the European Union be enacted as law?" The result of the vote was 67% in favour, with a turnout of 82%. Austria subsequently joined the EU as part of the 1995 enlargement.

== Party positions ==
Position	Political parties
Yes	Social Democratic Party of Austria
Yes	Austrian People's Party
Yes	Liberal Forum
No	Freedom Party of Austria
No	Green Alternative
No	Communist Party of Austria

== Results ==
Choice	Votes	%
For	3,145,981	66.58
Against	1,578,850	33.42
Total	4,724,831	100.00
Valid votes	4,724,831	99.09
Invalid/blank votes	43,570	0.91
Total votes	4,768,401	100.00
Registered voters/turnout	5,790,578	82.35
Source: Nohlen & Stöver

=== By state ===
State	Registered voters	Valid (votes)	Yes (votes)	No (votes)	Yes (%)	No (%)
Burgenland	213,090	198,279	148,041	50.238	74.7%	25.3%
Carinthia	420,630	340,867	232,457	108,410	68.2%	31.8%
Lower Austria	1,115,663	999,471	678,988	320,483	67.9%	32.1%
Salzburg	347,387	284,283	184,948	99,335	65.1%	34.9%
Styria	907,991	728,037	501,481	226,556	68.9%	31.1%
Tyrol	455,396	351,201	198.990	152,211	56.7%	43.3%
Upper Austria	974,865	824,512	539,965	284,547	65.5%	34.5%
Vienna	1,133,690	820,675	542,905	277,770	66.2%	33.8%
Vorarlberg	221,863	177,506	118,206	59,300	66.6%	33.4%
Total	5,790,578	4,724,831	3,145,981	1,578,850	66.6%	33.4%
