= 2005 Luxembourg European Constitution referendum =

10 July 2005
- Are you in favor of the Treaty establishing a Constitution for Europe, signed in Rome on 29 October 2004?

Results
Choice	Votes	%
Yes	109,494	56.52%
No	84,221	43.48%
Valid votes	193,715	97.05%
Invalid or blank votes	5,894	2.95%
Total votes	199,609	100.00%
Registered voters/turnout	220,717	90.44%
- Yes votes sorted by commune

A referendum on ratifying the proposed European Constitution was held in Luxembourg on 10 July 2005. The referendum was Luxembourg's first since 1937. On 28 June 2005 Parliament approved the constitution in advance of the referendum, and although the referendum was consultative, parliament agreed to abide by the results.

Prime Minister Jean-Claude Juncker said that he expected a close vote and that he would resign if the referendum resulted in a 'no' vote. The final opinion poll published a month before the referendum indicated a small advantage for the "yes", but with 16% of voters undecided. Luxembourg is traditionally regarded as one of the EU's most enthusiastic member states, and most prominent political figures support the Constitution, with both the governing coalition and the main opposition parties campaigning for a 'yes' vote.

The proposal was approved by 56% of voters, making Luxembourg was the thirteenth EU member state to approve the EU treaty, but only the second approved in a referendum (after Spain). The vote came after French and the Dutch voters rejected the EU treaty.

== Results ==
Choice	Votes	%
For	109,494	56.52
Against	84,221	43.48
Total	193,715	100.00
Valid votes	193,715	97.05
Invalid/blank votes	5,894	2.95
Total votes	199,609	100.00
Registered voters/turnout	220,717	90.44
