= Polish European Constitution referendum =

The Polish referendum on the Treaty establishing a Constitution for Europe was a referendum expected to be held on in October 2005 to decide whether Poland should ratify the proposed Constitution of the European Union. After the rejection of the constitution by France and the Netherlands the referendum was cancelled.

Most opinion data showed that many Poles were enthusiastic about EU membership. The French and Dutch no's however decreased Polish support for the Constitution. A later opinion poll showed an increase in the number of people against the Constitution to 35%. The number of supporters had dropped to 40%.

Some of right wing parties were sceptical about the Constitution due to a feeling that the country had lost out on the issue of Polish voting strength during negotiations.

Former President Aleksander Kwaśniewski had said that a referendum on the Constitution could have been combined with the presidential elections in October 2005. It would have been legally binding in case of a turnout of at least half the electorate. In case of smaller the matter would be up for the Parliament to decide.

The project of a Constitutional Treaty was replaced by the Treaty of Lisbon.
