= 2003 Slovenian European Union and NATO membership referendum =

A referendum on membership of the European Union and NATO was held in Slovenia on 23 March 2003.

== Questions ==
Voters were asked two questions;

1. Do you agree to the proposal that the Republic of Slovenia should become a member of the European Union?
2. Do you agree to the proposal that the Republic of Slovenia should become a member of the North Atlantic Treaty Organization (NATO)?

Both questions received a majority in favor, with 90% voting for EU membership and 66% for NATO membership. Voter turnout was 60%.

== Results ==
Question	For		Against		Invalid/ blank	Total votes	Registered voters	Turnout	Outcome
Question	Votes	%	Votes	%	Invalid/ blank	Total votes	Registered voters	Turnout	Outcome
European Union membership	869,171	89.64	100,503	10.36	4,884	974,558	1,613,305	60.42	Approved
NATO membership	637,882	66.08	327,463	33.92	9,179	974,955	1,613,305	60.43	Approved
Source: DVK, DVK
