= 2005 Spanish European Constitution referendum =

2005 Spanish referendum on the introduction of a European Constitution

- 20 February 2005
- Do you approve of the Treaty establishing a Constitution for Europe?

Results
Choice	Votes	%
Yes	11,057,563	81.84%
No	2,453,002	18.16%
Valid votes	13,510,565	93.23%
Invalid or blank votes	981,187	6.77%
Total votes	14,491,752	100.00%
Registered voters/turnout	34,692,491	41.77%

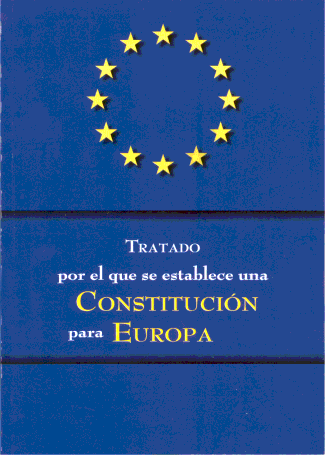
Front cover of an edition of the constitutional treaty published and distributed for free by the Spanish government

A referendum on the Treaty establishing a Constitution for Europe was held in Spain on Sunday, 20 February 2005. The question asked was "Do you approve of the Treaty establishing a Constitution for Europe?" (Spanish: ¿Aprueba usted el Tratado por el que se establece una Constitución para Europa?). The consultative referendum on ratification of the proposed Constitution for the European Union was approved by 81.8% of valid votes, although turnout was just 41.8%, the lowest since the end of the Franco era.

The referendum was not legally binding on the government, but it led to parliamentary ratification of the constitutional treaty, which happened in the Congress of Deputies on 28 April 2005, with a 319–19 result in favour of approval, and in the Spanish Senate on 18 May 2005 with a 225–6 result.

As of 2026, this is the most recent referendum held in Spain.

== Campaign ==
Both the governing Spanish Socialist Workers' Party (PSOE) and the main opposition People's Party (PP) campaigned for a "Yes" vote. They were joined by the Basque Nationalist Party (EAJ–PNV) and the Catalan nationalist Convergence and Union (CiU). Among the parties campaigning for a "No" vote were United Left (IU), the Bloque Nacionalista Galego (BNG, Galician National Bloc), Republican Left of Catalonia (ERC), Initiative for Catalonia Greens (ICV), the social democratic Aragonese Council (CHA), the Basque nationalist social democratic Eusko Alkartasuna, and the Trade Unions Confederación Intersindical Galega (CIG) and CGT.

Amidst widespread apathy surrounding the constitutional treaty, and ignorance of its contents (in a government poll, 90% of voters admitted to having little or no knowledge of its provisions), the government hired celebrities to read excerpts from the text in daily television broadcasts, and five million copies (without annexes) were sent out with Sunday papers. While many felt that the result of the referendum was a foregone conclusion, it was feared that turnout could be as low as 40 to 50% of the electorate. This turned out to be the case.

In late January 2005, several bodies campaigning for a "No" vote complained to Spain's independent National Electoral Commission about the government's planned information campaign:

- On 14 January, ERC demanded that the National Electoral Commission should block what it saw as unfair promotion of the treaty by the government.
- On 19 January, the Tomás Moro Centre for Juridical Studies (CJSTM) and Another Democracy is Possible complained to the National Electoral Commission about what they saw as the unfair nature of the government's campaign.

In response to these complaints, the Commission ruled that the government's campaign must be purely informative, and banned several of its campaign slogans:

The campaign to be carried out by the Government as part of the present referendum process must inform objectively on the contents of the Treaty... All value judgements and slogans previously used in TV, on websites and other media, e.g. 'We are first with Europe', and statements that could, directly or indirectly, influence the position or attitude of the citizens, must be removed.

== Results ==
Question

Do you approve of the Treaty establishing a Constitution for Europe?

Choice	Votes	%
For	11,057,563	81.84
Against	2,453,002	18.16
Total	13,510,565	100.00
Valid votes	13,510,565	93.23
Invalid/blank votes	981,187	6.77
Total votes	14,491,752	100.00
Registered voters/turnout	34,692,491	41.77
Source: Ministry of the Interior

=== By region ===
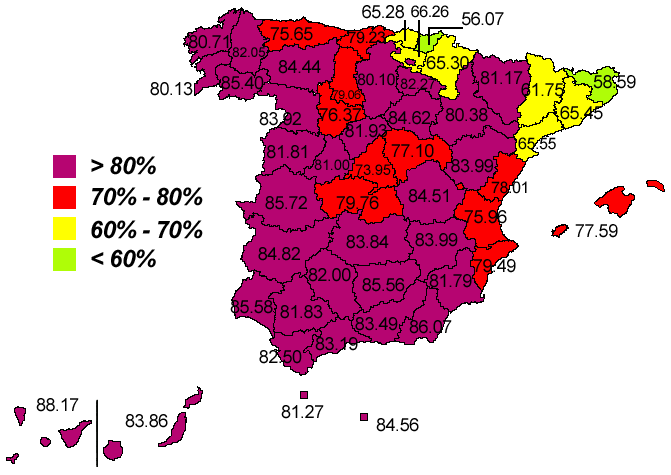
Distribution of "Yes" votes by province.

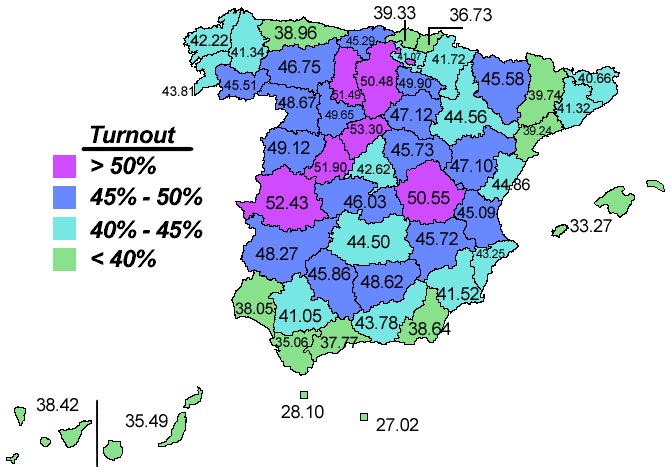
Distribution of the turnout by province.

Region	Electorate	Turnout	Yes		No	
Region	Electorate	Turnout	Votes	%	Votes	%
Andalusia	6,100,011	40.30	2,032,605	87.78	282,916	12.22
Aragon	1,018,912	44.67	365,452	86.39	57,583	13.61
Asturias	986,215	38.40	287,567	81.47	65,390	18.53
Balearic Islands	690,026	33.14	175,635	82.94	36,135	17.06
Basque Country	1,798,502	38.45	431,424	65.31	229,108	34.69
Canary Islands	1,473,346	36.53	461,153	89.82	52,266	10.18
Cantabria	481,183	44.55	168,613	84.65	30,573	15.35
Castile and León	2,177,491	48.62	851,707	86.69	130,813	13.31
Castilla–La Mancha	1,471,525	45.77	548,725	87.46	78,682	12.54
Catalonia	5,314,358	40.60	1,386,794	69.90	597,198	30.10
Ceuta	56,681	27.91	12,772	85.86	2,103	14.14
Extremadura	885,944	49.30	368,671	90.13	40,362	9.87
Galicia	2,617,092	41.14	876,289	87.54	124,745	12.46
La Rioja	235,859	48.83	94,443	87.34	13,695	12.66
Madrid	4,463,272	41.89	1,377,657	79.37	358,184	20.63
Melilla	13,005	26.36	10,940	87.61	1,547	12.39
Murcia	947,599	41.24	317,207	86.41	49,887	13.59
Navarre	467,355	41.23	125,191	69.39	55,233	30.61
Valencian Community	3,457,789	44.14	1,164,718	82.53	246,582	17.47
Total	34,692,491	41.77	11,057,563	81.84	2,453,002	18.16
