= Treaty establishing a Constitution for Europe =

2004 failed attempt to formally establish a constitution of the European Union

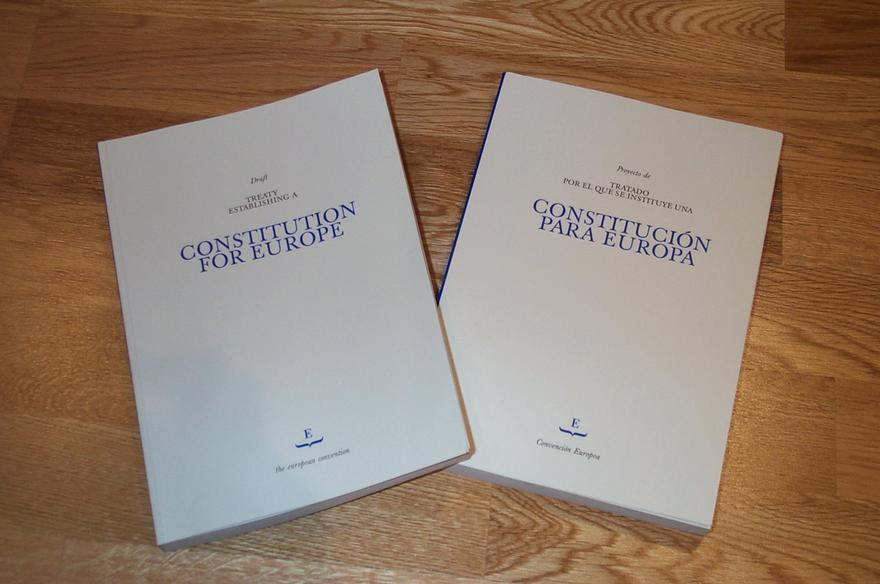
- Draft of the Treaty establishing a Constitution for Europe, 17 June 2004
- Type: Unratified treaty
- Drafted: June 2004
- Signed: 29 October 2004
- Location: Rome, Italy
- Sealed: 8 November 2004
- Signatories: EU member states
- Ratifiers: 18 / 25

Full text
- Treaty establishing a Constitution for Europe at Wikisource

The Treaty establishing a Constitution for Europe (TCE; commonly referred to as the European Constitution or as the Constitutional Treaty) was an unratified international treaty intended to create a consolidated constitution for the European Union (EU). It would have replaced the existing European Union treaties with a single text, given legal force to the Charter of Fundamental Rights, and expanded qualified majority voting into policy areas which had previously been decided by unanimity among member states.

The Treaty was signed on 29 October 2004 by representatives of the then 25 member states of the European Union. It was later ratified by 18 member states, which included referendums endorsing it in Spain and Luxembourg. However, the rejection of the document by French and Dutch voters in May and June 2005 brought the ratification process to an end.

Following a period of reflection, the Treaty of Lisbon was created to replace the Constitutional Treaty. This contained many of the changes that were originally placed in the Constitutional Treaty but, instead of repealing and replacing the existing treaties, simply amended them and abandoned the idea of a single codified constitution. Signed on 13 December 2007, the Lisbon Treaty entered into force on 1 December 2009, after ratification by all Member States.

== History ==
=== Drafting ===
The drafting of the European Constitution began in a call for a new debate on the future of Europe, made at the Laeken European Council in December 2001. A European Convention was founded shortly afterward; this was chaired by former French President Valéry Giscard d'Estaing and composed of two Members of the national Parliament (generally one from the governing majority and one from the opposition) of each Member State and applicant state, 16 MEPs, two members of the European Commission and a minister from each government. It met in public. Giscard d'Estaing proposed to draft a Constitution that would replace the existing treaties. Romano Prodi, the President of the European Commission, put forward a draft text, termed the 'Penelope Project', which contained a deeper integration of the countries and a clearer institutional model. National governments, parliaments and the European Parliament also put forward ideas.

The results of the convention were submitted to an Intergovernmental Conference (IGC) of the Member States during the Italian presidency of the EU Council. Some disputes arose over the proposed framework for qualified majority voting: the final text of the TCE was settled in June 2004 under the Irish presidency.

=== Mention of Christianity in the preamble ===
Several countries urged that the preamble of the Constitution include a reference to Christianity. Among these were Italy, Lithuania, Malta, Poland, Portugal, the Czech Republic, and Slovakia, which in May 2004 sent a letter to the Irish Presidency, saying "the governments of those countries consider as a priority the recognition of the Christian tradition in the Preamble" and noting that the list of signatories was not exhaustive as they hoped other countries would join their initiative. The Greek government likewise supported a reference to Christianity.

The strongest opponents of any reference to Christianity were France and Belgium. Other countries opposing such a reference were Germany, Denmark, Sweden, Finland, Slovenia, and Cyprus. Among other nations, Spain originally supported the inclusion of a reference to Christianity, but the incoming Zapatero government reversed the stance of its predecessor.

Eventually the agreed-upon Constitution made no explicit references to Christianity, only mentioning the "cultural, religious and humanist inheritance of Europe". This decision caused disappointment in the Vatican, but satisfaction from candidate state Turkey.

=== Signing ===
The Treaty establishing a Constitution for Europe was signed in Rome on 29 October 2004 by 53 senior political figures from the 25 member states of the European Union. In most cases heads of state designated plenipotentiaries to sign the treaty, but some presidents also signed on behalf of states which were republics. Most designated plenipotentiaries were prime ministers and foreign ministers.

=== Ratification ===
Ratifications in member states and candidate countries Yes – Part of accession treaty Yes – Parliament vote Yes – Referendum No – Referendum Referendum cancelled and never held Referendum never held

On 12 January 2005 the European Parliament voted a legally non-binding resolution (Corbett-Mendez de Vigo Report) approving the Constitution by 500 votes in favour to 137 votes against, with 40 abstentions.

Before an EU treaty can enter into force, it must be ratified by all member states. Ratification takes different forms in each country, depending on its traditions, constitutional arrangements and political processes. Most member states ratify EU treaties following parliamentary votes, while some — notably Ireland and Denmark — sometimes hold referendums, in Ireland's case where the treaty requires a constitutional amendment, for all amendments have to be approved by referendum. As a reaction to what was seen as the novel nature of the Constitution, many advocates and opponents of the Constitution argued that it should be subjected to referendums across the European Union.

On 20 April 2004, the then British prime minister Tony Blair unexpectedly announced an intention to hold a referendum, a proposal which he had previously rejected. A further seven member states announced or had already announced that they would hold referendums on the Constitution, these being Denmark, France, Ireland, Luxembourg, the Netherlands, Spain and Portugal.

Spain was the first country to hold a referendum on the Constitution. On 20 February 2005, Spanish voters backed the treaty with 76% voting in favour to 24% against, on a turnout of 43%.

On 29 May 2005, the French people rejected the Constitution by a margin of 55% to 45% on a turnout of 69%. On 1 June, the Dutch people rejected the constitution by a margin of 61% to 39% on a turnout of 62%.

Notwithstanding the rejection in France and the Netherlands, Luxembourg held a referendum on 10 July 2005 approving the Constitution by 57% to 43%. It was the last referendum to be held on the Constitution, for all of the other member states that had proposed to hold referendums cancelled them.

=== Post-rejection ===
Following the French and Dutch referendum results, European leaders decided to hold a "period of reflection" on what to do next. As part of this reflection period, a group of politicians and officials was set up to consider possible courses of action. This group of high-level European politicians – former prime ministers, ministers and members of the European Commission – first met on 30 September 2006 in Rome.

On 4 June 2007, this group, known as the Amato Group, presented its report. They proposed to establish a new Inter-Governmental Conference with a view to writing a new treaty which would rewrite the Maastricht Treaty, amend the Treaty of Rome and give the Charter of Fundamental Rights of the European Union a legally binding status. The new treaty would be based on the first and fourth parts of the Constitution, the rest of the Constitution's changes being achieved through amendments to the Treaty of Rome.

In the June 2007 European summit meeting, member states agreed to abandon the constitution and to amend the existing treaties, which would remain in force. They also agreed a detailed mandate for a new intergovernmental conference to negotiate a new treaty containing such amendments to the existing treaties (primarily the Treaty of Rome and the Treaty of Maastricht). These negotiations were completed by the end of the year. The new treaty, which had previously been referred to as the Reform Treaty, became the Treaty of Lisbon on its signing in Lisbon on 13 December 2007.

=== National processes at a glance ===
Member state	Date	Result	Deposition with Italian Government
Lithuania	11 November 2004	Yes. Seimas: 84 to 4 in favour, 3 abstentions.	17 December 2004
Hungary	20 December 2004	Yes. Országgyűlés: 323 to 12 in favour, 8 abstention.	30 December 2004
Slovenia	1 February 2005	Yes. Državni zbor: 79 to 4 in favour, 0 abstentions.	9 May 2005
Italy	25 January 2005; 6 April 2005	Yes. Camera dei Deputati: 436 to 28 in favour, 5 abstentions. Yes. Senato della Repubblica: 217 to 16 in favour, 0 abstentions.	25 May 2005
Spain	20 February 2005; 28 April 2005; 18 May 2005; 20 May 2005	Yes. Consultive referendum: 76.73% to 17.24% in favour, 6.03% blanks, 42.32% participation. Yes. Congreso de los Diputados: 311 to 19 in favour, 0 abstentions. Yes. Senado: 225 to 6 in favour, 1 abstention. Royal Assent. King Juan Carlos I	15 June 2005
Austria	11 May 2005; 25 May 2005	Yes. Nationalrat: Approved by show of hands with 1 against. Yes. Bundesrat: Approved by show of hands with three against.	17 June 2005
Greece	19 April 2005	Yes. Hellenic Parliament: 268 to 17 in favour, 15 abstentions.	28 July 2005
Malta	6 July 2005	Yes. Il-Kamra: Agreed without a division.	2 August 2005
Cyprus	30 June 2005	Yes. Cyprus Parliament: 30 to 19 in favour, one abstention.	6 October 2005
Latvia	2 June 2005	Yes. Saeima: 71 to 5 in favour, six abstentions.	3 January 2006
Luxembourg	10 July 2005; 25 October 2005	Yes. Consultative referendum: 56.52% to 43.48% in favour, 87.77% participation. Yes. Châmber: 57 to 1 in favour, no abstentions.	30 January 2006
Belgium	28 April 2005; 19 May 2005; 17 June 2005; 20 June 2005; 29 June 2005; 19 July 2005; 8 February 2006	Yes. Senaat/Sénat: 54 to 9 in favour, one abstention. Yes. Kamer/Chambre: 118 to 18 in favour, one abstention. Yes. Parlement Bruxellois/Brussels Hoofdstedelijk Parlement: 70 to 10 in favour, 0 abstentions. Yes. Parlament der Deutschsprachigen Gemeinschaft: 21 to 2 in favour, no abstentions. Yes. Parlement wallon: 55 to 2 in favour, 0 abstention. Yes. Parlement de la Communauté française: 79 to 0 in favour, no abstentions. Yes. Vlaams Parlement: 84 to 29 in favour, one abstention.	13 June 2006
Estonia	9 May 2006	Yes. Riigikogu: 73 to 1 in favour, no abstentions.	26 September 2006
Bulgaria	1 January 2007	Yes. Due to the provisions of Treaty of Accession 2005	Not required
Romania	1 January 2007	Yes. Due to the provisions of Treaty of Accession 2005	Not required
Slovakia	11 May 2005	Yes. Národná rada: 116 to 27 in favour, four abstentions.	
Germany	12 May 2005; 27 May 2005; 31 October 2006	Yes. Bundestag: 569 to 23 in favour, two abstentions. Yes. Bundesrat: 66 to 0 in favour, three abstentions. Frozen. Constitutional Court	
Finland incl. Åland	5 December 2006; Cancelled	Yes. Eduskunta/Riksdag: 125 to 39 in favour, four abstentions. Lagting	
France	29 May 2005; Cancelled; Cancelled	No. Referendum: 54.68% to 45.32% against, 69.34% participation. Assemblée Nationale: Sénat:	
Netherlands	1 June 2005; Cancelled; Cancelled	No. Consultative referendum: 61.54% to 38.46% against, 63.30% participation. Tweede Kamer: Eerste Kamer:	
Czech Republic	Cancelled; Cancelled; Cancelled	Referendum: Senát: Poslanecká sněmovna:	
Denmark	Cancelled; Cancelled	Referendum: Folketinget:	
Ireland	Cancelled; Cancelled; Cancelled	Referendum: Dáil Éireann: Seanad Éireann:	
Poland	Cancelled; Cancelled; Cancelled	Referendum: Sejm: Senat:	
Portugal	Cancelled; Cancelled	Referendum: Assembleia da República:	
Sweden	Cancelled	Riksdag:	
United Kingdom	Cancelled; Cancelled; Cancelled; Cancelled	Referendum: House of Commons: House of Lords: Queen Elizabeth II:	

== Content ==
=== Institutional structure ===
Under the TCE, the Council of the European Union would have been formally renamed the "Council of Ministers", which is already its informal title. The "General Affairs Council" would have been formally split from the "Foreign Affairs Council", which had informally held meetings separately since June 2002.

The TCE proposed the formal recognition of a flag, an anthem and a motto for the Union, although none of them were new.

=== Conferral, subsidiarity, proportionality ===
The TCE would have reiterated several key principles of how the Union functions:

- the principle of conferral: that all EU competences are conferred on it voluntarily by member states;
- the principle of subsidiarity: that governmental decisions should be taken at the lowest level possible while still remaining effective;
- the principle of proportionality: that the EU may only act exactly to the extent that is needed to achieve its objectives;
- the primacy of EU law: in areas where member states have made legally binding agreements at EU level, they may not then pass national laws incompatible with those EU laws.

The TCE would have specified that the EU is a union of member states, and that all its competences (areas of responsibility) are voluntarily conferred on it by its member states according to the principle of conferral. The EU would have no competences by right, and thus any areas of policy not explicitly specified in the Constitution would have remained the domain of the sovereign member states (notwithstanding the 'flexibility clause').

According to the TCE, the EU may act (i.e. make laws) only where its member states agree unanimously that actions by individual countries would be insufficient. This is the principle of subsidiarity and is based on the legal and political principle that governmental decisions should be taken as close to the people as possible while still remaining effective. It is a main argument against claims that Europe limits national sovereignty, but critics say that it is a principle to which lip service only is paid and, in practice, the reach of the EU has been increasingly ambitious.

=== Primacy of Union law ===
Amongst European countries, the European Court of Justice has consistently ruled since 1964 that EU law has primacy over the laws of member states in the areas where member states allow it to legislate. National law that is incompatible with an agreement already made at European level is deemed to be 'disapplied' when questions arise in courts. This controversial and fundamental principle of European Community law was first recognised in the case of Van Gend en Loos in 1963 which was followed in Costa v ENEL in 1964.

=== Judicial protection and fundamental rights ===
The TCE would have maintained the role of the Court of Justice of the European Union (articles III-353 et seq.).

It would further have rendered the (at that point) non-binding Charter of Fundamental Rights legally binding. Unlike the Treaty of Lisbon, it incorporated the text of the Charter in the Treaty itself (see Part II of the TCE). This included various adjustments to the Charter as promulgated in 2000, including granting persuasive value to the Explanations to the Charter (see article II-112(7) and Declaration 12 to the TCE).

This would continue to exist alongside the protection of fundamental rights as general principles of EU law (article (I-9(3) TCE). Further, article I-9(2) TCE required the EU to accede to the European Convention on Human Rights.

=== Common values of the Union's member states ===
As stated in Articles I-1 and I-2, the Union is open to all European States that respect the member states' common values, namely:

- human dignity
- freedom
- democracy
- equality
- the rule of law
- respect for human rights
- minority rights.

Member states also declare that the following principles prevail in their society:

- pluralism
- non-discrimination
- tolerance
- justice
- solidarity
- equality of the sexes.

Some of these provisions would have been codified for the first time in the TCE.

=== Aims of the Union ===
The aims of the EU were stated to be (Article I-3):

- promotion of peace, its values and the well-being of its people.
- maintenance of freedom, security and justice without internal borders, and an internal market where competition is free and undistorted.
- sustainable development based on balanced economic growth and price stability, a highly competitive social market economy.
- social justice and protection, equality between women and men, solidarity between generations and protection of the rights of the child.
- economic, social and territorial cohesion, and solidarity among member states.
- respect for linguistic and cultural diversity.

In its relations with the wider world the Union's objectives are:

- to uphold and promote its values and interests.
- to contribute to peace, security, the sustainable development of the Earth.
- solidarity and mutual respect among people.
- free and fair trade.
- eradication of poverty and the protection of human rights, in particular the rights of the child.
- strict observance and development of international law, including respect for the principles of the United Nations Charter.

=== Scope of the Union ===
==== Competences ====
The EU has six exclusive competences, policy areas in which member states have agreed that they should act exclusively through the EU and not legislate at a national level. The list remains unchanged from the previous treaties:

- customs union;
- those competition rules that govern the internal market;
- eurozone monetary policy;
- conservation of marine biological resources (the Common Fisheries Policy);
- common commercial policy;
- the conclusion of certain limited international agreements.

There are a number of shared competences. These are areas in which member states may act both nationally and through the EU. If they act through the EU, then any national action must not contradict the joint action. Three new shared competences have been added to those in previous treaties.

There are a number of areas where the EU may take only supporting, coordinating or complementary action. In these areas, member states do not confer any competences on the Union, but they can agree to act through the Union in order to support their work at national level. Again, three new competences have been added to those from previous treaties.

==== Flexibility clause ====
The TCE's flexibility clause allows the EU to act in areas not made explicit in the TCE, but only:

- if all member states agree;
- with the consent of the European Parliament; and
- where this is necessary to achieve an agreed objective under the TCE.

This clause has been present in EU law since the original Treaty of Rome, which established the EEC in 1958.

==== Common foreign and security policy ====
The EU is charged with defining and implementing a common foreign and security policy in due time. The wording of this article is taken from the existing Treaty on European Union.

== New provisions ==
=== Legal personality ===
The TCE was going to state explicitly that the EU had a legal personality. Prior to this, the treaties explicitly stated that the European Economic Community, the European Coal and Steel Community and Euratom each had their own separate legal personality, but remained silent over whether the European Union itself had one. They did mandate the EU "to assert its identity on the international scene", and permitted the European Union to enter into treaties. Brsakoska-Bazerkoska, and Choutheete and Ndoura argue that the EU had an implicit legal personality prior to the Treaty of Lisbon; the latter treaty also contained an express statement that the EU had a legal personality.

=== New competences ===
The TCE would have conferred upon the EU as new 'shared competences' the areas of territorial cohesion, energy, and space. These are areas where the EU may act alongside its individual member states. The EU has conferred upon it as new areas of 'supporting, coordinating or complementary action' the areas of tourism, sport, and administrative co-operation.

=== Criminal justice proceedings ===
Member states would have continued to co-operate in some areas of criminal judicial proceedings where they agree to do so, as at present. Under the TCE, seven new areas of co-operation would have been added, to combat:

- Child abuse
- Drug trafficking
- Fraud
- Human trafficking
- Political corruption
- Terrorism
- Trafficking of arms

=== Solidarity clause ===
The new solidarity clause of the TCE specifies that any member state which falls victim to a terrorist attack or other disaster will receive assistance from other member states, if it requests it. The type of assistance to be offered is not specified. Instead, the arrangements are to be decided by the Council of Ministers should the situation arise.

=== European Public Prosecutor ===
Provision exists for the creation of a European Public Prosecutor's Office, if all member states agree to it and if the European Parliament gives its consent.

=== Charter of Fundamental Rights of the European Union ===
The TCE includes a copy of the Charter already agreed to by all EU member states. This is included in the Constitution so that EU institutions themselves are obliged to conform to the same standards of fundamental rights. At the time of the Charter's original agreement, the British Government said that it did not have binding effect. Incorporation into TCE would have put its importance beyond doubt.

=== Simplification ===
==== Simplified jargon and legal instruments ====
The TCE made an effort to simplify jargon and reduce the number of EU legal instruments. However, it is a long document couched in technical terms, which proved unpopular when presented (for example) to French voters in their referendum on the TCE.

The TCE unifies legal instruments across areas of policy (referred to as pillars of the European Union in previous treaties). Specifically:

- 'Regulations' (of the Community pillar) and 'Decisions' (of the Police and Judicial Co-operation in Criminal Matters (PJC) pillar) both become referred to as European laws.
- 'Directives' (of the Community pillar) and 'Framework Decisions' (of the PJC pillar) both become referred to as European framework laws.
- 'Conventions' (of the PJC pillar) are done away with, replaced in every case by either European laws or European framework laws.
- 'Joint actions' and 'Common positions' (of what is now the Common Foreign and Security Policy Pillar) are both replaced by Decisions.

==== Position of Union Minister for Foreign Affairs ====
Under the TCE, the role of High Representative for the Common Foreign and Security Policy would be amalgamated with the role of the Commissioner for External Relations. This would create a new Union Minister for Foreign Affairs who would also be a Vice President of the commission. This individual would be responsible for co-ordinating foreign policy across the Union, representing the EU abroad in areas where member states agree to speak with one voice.

=== Functioning of the institutions ===
==== Qualified majority voting ====
More day-to-day decisions in the Council of Ministers would be to be taken by qualified majority voting, requiring a 55% majority of members of the Council representing a 65% majority of citizens. (The 55% is raised to 72% when the Council acts on its own initiative rather than on a legislative proposal from the commission or the Union Minister for Foreign Affairs.) The unanimous agreement of all member states would only be required for decisions on more sensitive issues, such as tax, social security, foreign policy and defence.

==== President of the European Council ====
The Presidency of the European Council would switch from a six-month rotation among members of the European Council to a chair chosen by them, in office for 2 1/2 years and renewable once. The role itself would remain largely non-executive, tasked with seeking agreements among the national leaders, but would be full time (the President would no longer be a Prime Minister or President of a Member State) and longer-term, thereby enabling the incumbent to have more time for the task.

==== President of the Council of Ministers ====
The six-month rotating Presidency of the Council of Ministers, would be changed to an 18-month rotating Presidency shared by a trio of member countries, in an attempt to provide more continuity. The exception would be the council's Foreign Affairs configuration, which would be chaired by the newly created Union Minister for Foreign Affairs.

==== Smaller Commission ====
The Commission would be reduced in size from 27 to 18 by the year 2014. There would be fewer Commissioners, with member states taking it in turn to nominate Commissioners two times out of three.

=== Parliamentary power and transparency ===
- President of the Commission: The candidate for President of the European Commission would be proposed by the European Council, after consultation with the European Parliament, and would be elected by the European Parliament. Parliament would have the final say.
- Parliament as co-legislature: The European Parliament would acquire equal legislative power under the codecision procedure with the Council in virtually all areas of policy. Previously, it had this power in most cases but not all.
- Meeting in public: The Council of Ministers would be required to meet in public when debating all new laws. Currently, it meets in public only for texts covered under the codecision procedure.
- Budget: The final say over the EU's annual budget would be given to the European Parliament. Agricultural spending would no longer be ring-fenced, and would be brought under the Parliament's control.
- Role of national parliaments: Member states' national parliaments would be given a new role in scrutinising proposed EU laws, and would be entitled to object if they feel a proposal oversteps the boundary of the Union's agreed areas of responsibility. If the Commission wishes to ignore such an objection, it would be forced to submit an explanation to the parliament concerned and to the Council of Ministers.
- Popular initiative: The commission would be invited to consider any proposal "on matters where citizens consider that a legal act of the Union is required for the purpose of implementing the Constitution" which has the support of one million citizens. The mechanism by which this would be put into practice has yet to be agreed. (See Article I-46(4) for details.)

=== Further integration, amendment and withdrawal ===
==== Enhanced co-operation ====
There would have been a tightening of existing rules for 'enhanced cooperation', where some member states would have chosen to act together more closely and others not. A minimum of one third of member states would now be forced to participate in any enhanced cooperation, and the agreement of the European Parliament is needed. The option for enhanced cooperation would also be widened to all areas of agreed EU policy.

==== Treaty revisions ====
Traditionally amendments to the EU treaties were considered in inter-governmental conferences in which the European Council would meet in long private sessions in order to reach unanimous agreement on the proposed changes. The Convention which wrote the draft constitutional treaty was quite different in this regard. It met in public and was composed of a mix of national and European politicians. The Constitution proposed that future amendments to the Constitution would also be drafted by a convention unless both the Council of Minister and the European Parliament agreed otherwise.

A simplified revision was created for changes which might be proposed to be made to Title III of Part III of the TCE on the internal policies and action of the Union. Changes to this Title could be made by a decision of the European Council subject to it being ratified by all member states.

The Constitution also proposed a general 'passerelle clause' (Article IV-444) with which the European Council could agree to:

- move from unanimity voting to qualified majority voting, or
- move from a special legislative procedure to the ordinary legislative procedure

in a specific policy area.

Although the Lisbon Treaty was itself finalised behind closed doors by the European Council, it adopted the amendment procedures proposed by the Constitution for future revisions.

==== Withdrawal clause ====
A new clause in the TCE provided for the unilateral withdrawal of any member state from the Union (clause I-60). Under this clause, when a country notifies the Council of its intent to withdraw, a settlement is agreed in the council with the consent of Parliament. If negotiations are not agreed within two years, the country leaves anyway. An identical provision was subsequently inserted into the treaties by the Lisbon Treaty (and, in 2016–20, used by the UK).

== See also ==
- Treaties of the European Union
