= 2005 French European Constitution referendum =

- 29 May 2005
- Do you approve the bill authorising the ratification of the treaty establishing a Constitution for Europe?

Results
Choice	Votes	%
Yes	12,808,270	45.33%
No	15,449,508	54.67%
Valid votes	28,257,778	97.48%
Invalid or blank votes	730,522	2.52%
Total votes	28,988,300	100.00%
Registered voters/turnout	41,789,202	69.37%
- Results by département Yes: 50–55% >55% No: 50–55% 55–60% > 60%

A referendum on the Treaty establishing a Constitution for Europe was held in France on 29 May 2005 to decide whether the French government should ratify the proposed constitution of the European Union. The result was a victory for the "no" campaign, with 55% of voters rejecting the treaty on a turnout of 69%.

France was the second country to go to the polls in a referendum on ratification, after a Spanish referendum approved the treaty by a wide margin in February, but was the first to reject the treaty. France's rejection of the Constitution left the treaty with an uncertain future, with other EU member states pledging to continue with their own arrangements for ratification.

The result was surprising to political commentators, with those in favour of the "yes" vote having received 71% of mentions on television between 1 January and 31 March.

As of 2026, this was the most recent referendum in France.

== Background ==
The text of the European Constitution, as distributed to each French voter

President Jacques Chirac's decision to hold a referendum was thought in some part to have been influenced in part by the surprise announcement that the United Kingdom was to hold a vote of its own, though it was also widely commented that the expected easy victory would also be an expression of confidence in the President. Moreover, it would do much to cement his legacy as a French statesman. It would also have a divisive effect on the opposition Socialist Party. Although the adoption of a Constitution had initially been played down as a 'tidying-up' exercise with no need for a popular vote, as increasing numbers of EU member states announced their intention to hold a referendum, the French government came under increasing pressure to follow suit. The referendum date was announced on 4 March 2005.

However, prior to the referendum, the Constitutional Council of France ruled that the European Constitution could not legally coexist with the current Constitution of France. For that reason, a vote was taken to amend the Constitution of France to make the two documents compatible. This amendment passed in an extraordinary joint session of deputies and senators at the Palace of Versailles on 28 February 2005, with 730 votes in favour and 66 votes against, with 96 abstentions. Both the ruling party and the Socialists supported the constitutional amendment. Communist Party members were the only ones to vote against it.

== Campaign ==
All the three major political forces, the Union for a Popular Movement, Socialist Party and Union for French Democracy, supported the proposed constitution, as did president Chirac. Supporters of the constitution from the left sought to emphasise that the treaty would incorporate a Charter of Fundamental Rights and thus helped to secure the future of the European social model. Somewhat surprisingly considering his usual political orientation, Jacques Chirac defended it as a possible barrier against neoliberal economic policies.

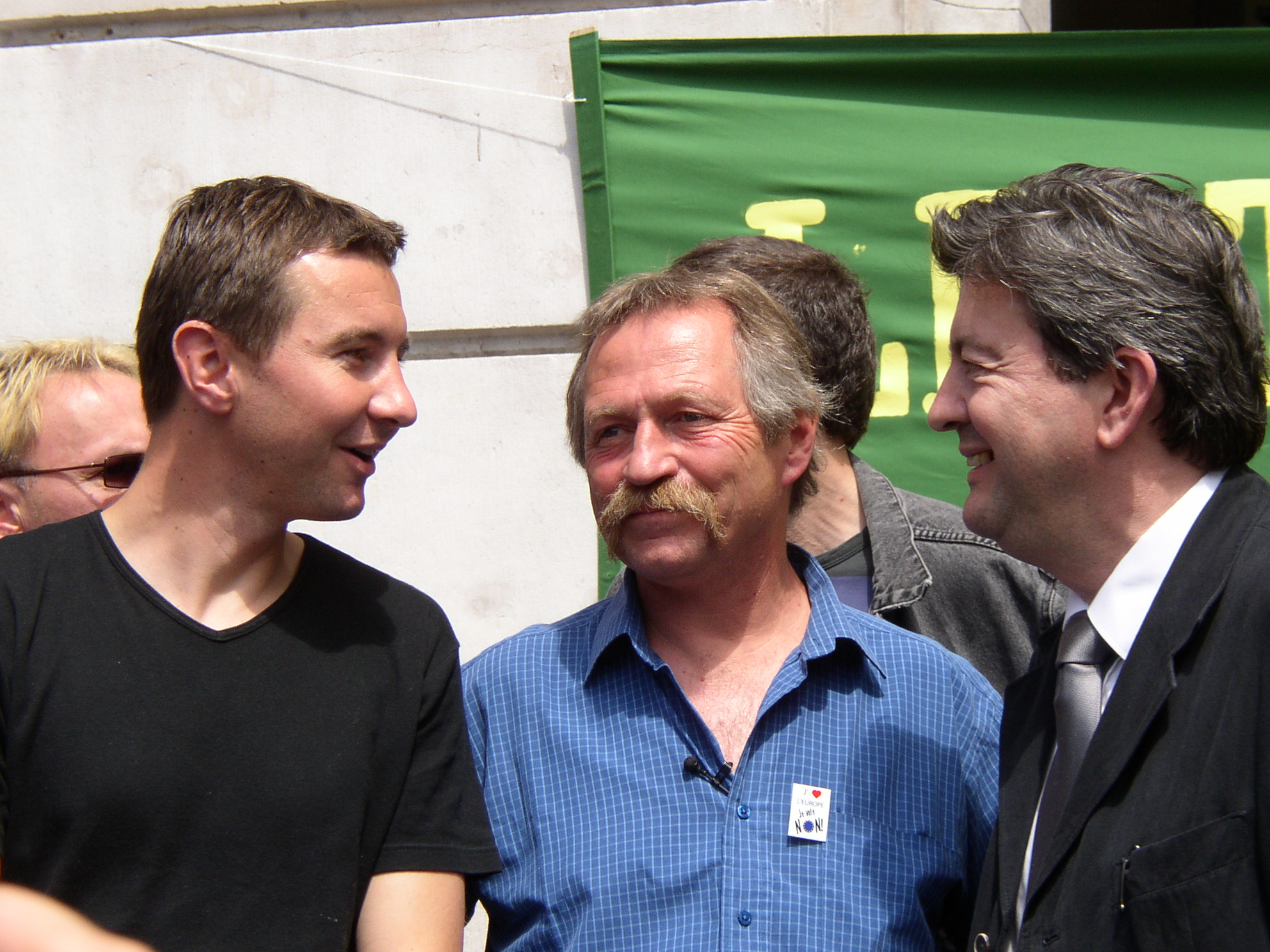
Olivier Besancenot, José Bové and Jean-Luc Mélenchon at a meeting supporting the "No" vote.

Objections to the constitution in France could be broadly divided into two camps. On the left, many expressed the view that the Constitution would enforce a neoliberal economic model. Among those were some members of the Socialist Party who dissented from the party's stance as decided by its internal referendum, some members of the Green Party (though the party's official policy was also to support ratification), the Communist Party and the Citizen and Republican Movement - a small party allied to the Socialist Party. The Radical Party of the Left, another ally of the Socialist Party, was divided on the question: its main representatives were for the Constitution, while Christiane Taubira, who was candidate for the PRG in 2002, was against it.

Other parties of the hard left, such as the Trotskyist Revolutionary Communist League and Workers' Struggle, as well as associations like ATTAC and trade unions such as the CGT or SUD opposed ratification. These critics sought to link the Constitution to the proposed directive on services in the internal market, which is widely opposed in France.

There were also prominent opponents of the Constitution from the right, notably Nicolas Dupont-Aignan (a Gaullist) and Philippe de Villiers (of the Movement for France), and from the far right, Jean-Marie Le Pen of the National Front, who opposed the Constitution on the grounds that France should not be part of any institution whose decisions can take precedence over what is decided in France at a national level. Another factor in the defeat of the Constitution may have been the linking of the Constitution in the minds of voters with the possibility of the accession of Turkey to the European Union, with which most of the French population disagrees. The British UK Independence Party MEP Nigel Farage used funds from the EU Information Budget to send literature to French households opposing the Constitution.

=== Socialist Party vote on stance ===
On 1 December 2004, the opposition Socialist Party held a vote among its members to determine the stance it would take. The issue of the Constitution had caused considerable divisions within the party, with many members—although broadly in favour of European integration—opposing the Constitution for reasons including a perceived lack of democratic accountability, and the threat they considered it posed to the European social model. The "Yes" side was led by party leader François Hollande while the "No" side was led by deputy leader Laurent Fabius. A former prime minister of France (1984–1986), Laurent Fabius traditionally on the center right of the Socialist Party opted for the No to the Constitution, switching to the left of the party. For many commentators, this paradoxical move was a gamble to get the upper hand within the party before the next presidential elections, in case of success of the No vote.

Within the Socialist Party, out of 127,027 members eligible to vote, 59% voted "Yes", with a turnout of 79%. Out of 102 Socialist Party regional federations, 26 voted "No".

== Opinion polls ==
Opinion polling had shown the "Yes" and "No" campaigns in the lead at various times, but in the weeks leading up the referendum the "No" campaign consistently held the lead. This led many, even some on the "Yes" side, to predict openly that France would reject the Constitution.

Opinion polling from September 2004 to April 2005 Yes No

== Results ==
Ballots for the referendum.

Choice	Votes	%
For	12,808,270	45.33
Against	15,449,508	54.67
Total	28,257,778	100.00
Valid votes	28,257,778	97.48
Invalid/blank votes	730,522	2.52
Total votes	28,988,300	100.00
Registered voters/turnout	41,789,202	69.37
Source: Ministry of the Interior

=== By region ===
Region	For	%	Against	%	Invalid votes	Turnout
Alsace	418,268	53.44	364,356	46.56	2.65	68.29
Aquitaine	655,690	42.84	874,793	57.16	2.74	73.38
Auvergne	287,179	42.43	389,707	57.57	3.11	71.88
Burgundy	320,846	41.48	452,703	58.52	2.63	70.16
Brittany	802,273	50.90	773,947	49.10	2.71	73.35
Centre	512,279	43.01	678,832	56.99	2.68	71.81
Champagne-Ardenne	258,028	42.90	343,379	57.10	2.20	68.31
Corsica	45,598	42.24	62,364	57.76	1.33	56.13
Franche-Comté	234,699	42.19	321,565	57.81	2.73	72.98
Guadeloupe	33,779	58.60	23,863	41.40	10.34	22.21
French-Guyana	6,850	60.14	4,541	39.86	9.99	23.11
Île-de-France	2,278,402	53.99	1,941,984	46.01	1.84	70.43
Languedoc-Roussillon	451,225	37.62	748,153	62.38	2.59	72.24
Limousin	157,357	40.75	228,779	59.25	3.56	73.78
Lothringia	467,072	43.57	605,036	56.43	2.18	67.83
Martinique	48,179	69.03	21,620	30.97	9.65	28.37
Midi-Pyrénées	588,830	42.84	785,771	57.16	3.23	74.27
Nord-Pas-de-Calais	661,394	35.12	1,222,089	64.88	2.26	69.29
Basse-Normandie	324,402	44.81	399,501	55.19	2.33	71.88
Haute-Normandie	308,993	35.60	559,020	64.40	2.01	72.37
Pays de la Loire	841,866	50.11	838,038	49.89	3.24	72.11
Picardie	315,959	34.96	587,713	65.04	2.02	72.10
Poitou-Charentes	382,090	44.65	473,609	55.35	3.11	71.78
Provence-Alpes-Côte d’Azur	860,524	41.21	1,227,731	58.79	1.94	69.26
Réunion	95,298	40.01	142,871	59.99	5.73	53.62
Rhône-Alpes	1,241,229	48.38	1,324,332	51.62	2.47	69.96

=== By department ===
Department	For	%	Against	%	Valid votes	Invalid votes	Total votes	Registered voters	Turnout
Paris	532,040	66.45	268,617	33.55	800,657	13,126	813,783	1,084,114	75.06
Seine-et-Marne	225,904	44.80	278,308	55.20	504,212	10,888	515,100	733,535	70.22
Yvelines	353,085	59.53	240,020	40.47	593,105	10,256	603,361	836,989	72.09
Essonne	236,408	49.29	243,221	50.71	479,629	9,864	489,493	685,325	71.42
Hauts-de-Seine	358,968	61.90	220,915	38.10	579,883	10,201	590,084	826,795	71.37
Seine-Saint-Denis	150,848	38.48	241,151	61.52	391,999	8,194	400,193	637,385	62.79
Val-de Marne	229,880	50.00	229,921	50.00	459,801	8,599	468,400	684,036	68.48
Val-de Oise	191,269	46.53	219,831	53.47	411,100	8,187	419,287	616,343	68.03
Ardennes	47,478	37.21	80,125	62.79	127,603	2,664	130,267	192,179	67.78
Aube	56,807	42.99	75,345	57.01	132,152	3,203	135,355	196,136	69.01
Marne	113,948	46.33	131,988	53.67	245,936	5,193	251,129	370,728	67.74
Haute-Marne	39,795	41.58	55,921	58.42	95,716	2,441	98,157	141,073	69.58
Aisne	85,475	33.25	171,616	66.75	257,091	5,473	262,564	366,193	71.70
Oise	134,591	37.62	223,129	62.38	357,720	6,998	364,718	513,072	71.09
Somme	95,893	33.20	192,968	66.80	288,861	6,192	295,053	400,004	73.76
Eure	100,447	37.10	170,308	62.90	270,755	5,614	276,369	382,292	72.29
Seine-Maritime	208,546	34.92	388,712	65.08	597,258	12,211	609,469	841,738	72.41
Cher	60,935	39.60	92,927	60.40	153,862	4,399	158,261	226,259	69.95
Eure-et-Loir	82,338	42.57	111,075	57.43	193,413	4,973	198,386	279,243	71.04
Indre	44,871	36.72	77,338	63.28	122,209	4,283	126,492	174,877	72.33
Indre-et-Loire	123,389	45.68	146,707	54.32	270,096	6,835	276,931	378,397	73.19
Loir-et-Cher	67,721	41.01	97,425	58.99	165,146	4,648	169,794	232,895	72.91
Loiret	133,025	46.45	153,360	53.55	286,385	7,634	294,019	412,617	71.26
Calvados	142,966	44.24	180,191	55.76	323,157	6,863	330,020	459,573	71.81
Manche	114,958	45.74	136,363	54.26	251,321	6,577	257,898	359,667	71.70
Orne	66,478	44.49	82,947	55.51	149,425	3,815	153,240	211,837	72.34
Côte-d'Or	107,202	46.10	125,347	53.90	232,549	5,385	237,934	331,637	71.75
Nièvre	41,764	36.51	72,635	63.49	114,399	2,966	117,365	166,883	70.33
Saône-et-Loire	107,843	40.70	157,135	59.30	264,978	8,852	273,830	397,394	68.91
Yonne	64,037	39.62	97,586	60.38	161,623	3,718	165,341	236,494	69.91
Nord	437,285	38.06	711,580	61.94	1,148,865	26,103	1,174,968	1,725,296	68.10
Pas-de-Calais	224,109	30.51	510,509	69.49	734,618	17,491	752,109	1,055,794	71.24
Meurthe-et-Moselle	138,272	43.41	180,239	56.59	318,511	6,279	324,790	473,008	68.66
Meuse	39,618	41.39	56,103	58.61	95,721	2,222	97,943	137,901	71.02
Moselle	209,035	45.23	253,176	54.77	462,211	9,824	472,035	721,154	65.46
Vosges	80,147	40.96	115,518	59.04	195,665	5,586	201,251	283,696	70.94
Bas-Rhin	256,189	56.11	200,433	43.89	456,622	12,445	469,067	687,298	68.25
Haut-Rhin	162,079	49.72	163,923	50.28	326,002	8,893	334,895	489,991	68.35
Doubs	110,011	46.14	128,414	53.86	238,425	6,328	244,753	337,752	72.47
Jura	54,899	42.46	74,398	57.54	129,297	3,797	133,094	180,881	73.58
Haute-Saône	46,099	36.78	79,224	63.22	125,323	3,727	129,050	175,160	73.68
Territoire de Belfort	23,690	37.47	39,529	62.53	63,219	1,561	64,780	89,511	72.37
Loire-Atlantique	305,127	51.12	291,722	48.88	596,849	17,585	614,434	844,344	72.77
Maine-et-Loire	192,037	52.99	170,367	47.01	362,404	12,766	375,170	518,825	72.31
Mayenne	77,285	52.37	70,285	47.63	147,570	5,972	153,542	214,687	71.52
Sarthe	113,383	42.58	152,878	57.42	266,261	8,313	274,574	387,989	70.77
Vendée	154,034	50.20	152,786	49.80	306,820	11,634	318,454	441,749	72.09
Côtes-d'Armor	146,445	46.72	166,991	53.28	313,436	8,530	321,966	430,720	74.75
Finistère	232,396	51.12	222,193	48.88	454,589	11,729	466,318	640,668	72.79
Ille-et-Vilaine	240,065	53.81	206,110	46.19	446,175	13,448	459,623	628,199	73.17
Morbihan	183,367	50.65	178,653	49.35	362,020	10,195	372,215	509,176	73.10
Charente	71,631	40.76	104,108	59.24	175,739	5,245	180,984	253,451	71.41
Charente Maritime	130,573	44.38	163,652	55.62	294,225	8,355	302,580	426,181	71.00
Deux-Sèvres	88,433	48.67	93,253	51.33	181,686	7,214	188,900	261,766	72.16
Vienne	91,453	44.82	112,596	55.18	204,049	6,683	210,732	288,959	72.93
Dordogne	83,512	37.64	138,347	62.36	221,859	7,160	229,019	300,288	76.27
Gironde	276,219	43.73	355,495	56.27	631,714	14,663	646,377	886,995	72.87
Landes	79,132	41.64	110,917	58.36	190,049	5,886	195,935	265,975	73.67
Lot-et-Garonne	62,741	38.04	102,203	61.96	164,944	5,372	170,316	230,573	73.87
Pyrénées-Atlantiques	154,086	47.87	167,831	52.13	321,917	10,071	331,988	460,580	72.08
Ariège	28,435	36.28	49,949	63.72	78,384	2,540	80,924	109,384	73.98
Aveyron	71,743	46.52	82,493	53.48	154,236	6,754	160,990	213,821	75.29
Haute-Garonne	240,661	46.10	281,408	53.90	522,069	14,205	536,274	733,866	73.08
Gers	40,949	41.59	57,502	58.41	98,451	3,877	102,328	136,301	75.08
Lot	38,559	40.23	57,282	59.77	95,841	3,266	99,107	128,313	77.24
Hautes-Pyrénées	47,671	38.98	74,636	61.02	122,307	3,644	125,951	170,504	73.87
Tarn	78,028	40.79	113,268	59.21	191,296	7,875	199,171	264,190	75.39
Tarn-et-Garonne	42,784	38.19	69,233	61.81	112,017	3,789	115,806	156,426	74.03
Corrèze	57,351	43.07	75,804	56.93	133,155	4,652	137,807	183,650	75.04
Creuse	25,433	38.06	41,386	61.94	66,819	2,542	69,361	99,706	69.57
Haute-Vienne	74,573	40.06	111,589	59.94	186,162	7,061	193,223	259,304	74.52
Ain	110,194	47.18	123,377	52.82	233,571	6,057	239,628	346,686	69.12
Ardèche	64,249	40.00	96,376	60.00	160,625	4,681	165,306	224,529	73.62
Drôme	93,060	41.78	129,696	58.22	222,756	6,045	228,801	318,483	71.84
Isère	232,316	46.42	268,107	53.58	500,423	12,248	512,671	730,733	70.16
Loire	141,887	44.16	179,386	55.84	321,273	9,790	331,063	485,077	68.25
Rhône	349,663	54.18	295,735	45.82	645,398	14,035	659,433	945,746	69.73
Savoie	90,331	48.63	95,412	51.37	185,743	4,673	190,416	271,196	70.21
Haute-Savoie	159,529	53.94	136,243	46.06	295,772	7,337	303,109	437,412	69.30
Allier	68,600	39.79	103,813	60.21	172,413	5,548	177,961	253,647	70.16
Cantal	38,999	47.44	43,203	52.56	82,202	2,792	84,994	121,975	69.68
Haute-Loire	49,998	42.10	68,759	57.90	118,757	4,475	123,232	168,088	73.31
Puy-de-Dôme	129,582	42.69	173,932	57.31	303,514	8,939	312,453	428,309	72.95
Aude	60,912	35.38	111,233	64.62	172,145	4,660	176,805	241,648	73.17
Gard	116,669	35.91	208,200	64.09	324,869	7,182	332,051	455,217	72.94
Hérault	181,531	39.86	273,892	60.14	455,423	14,019	469,442	654,395	71.74
Lozère	19,409	46.23	22,572	53.77	41,981	1,454	43,435	58,972	73.65
Pyrénées-Orientales	72,704	35.47	132,256	64.53	204,960	4,618	209,578	294,226	71.23
Alpes-de-Haute-Provence	32,072	39.73	48,647	60.27	80,719	2,242	82,961	112,632	73.66
Haute Alpes	30,536	44.13	38,666	55.87	69,202	2,034	71,236	97,823	72.82
Alpes-Maritimes	208,426	47.45	230,818	52.55	439,244	8,549	447,793	668,088	67.03
Bouches-du-Rhône	308,040	38.20	498,413	61.80	806,453	14,541	820,994	1,179,550	69.60
Var	189,811	42.46	257,183	57.54	446,994	8,286	455,280	666,146	68.35
Vaucluse	91,639	37.31	154,004	62.69	245,643	5,682	251,325	350,503	71.70
Corse-du-Sud	20,526	41.29	29,183	58.71	49,709	690	50,399	88,646	56.85
Haute-Corse	25,072	43.04	33,181	56.96	58,253	770	59,023	106,296	55.53
Guadeloupe	33,779	58.60	23,863	41.40	57,642	6,650	64,292	289,443	22.21
Martinique	48,179	69.03	21,620	30.97	69,799	7,453	77,252	272,339	28.37
French Guiana	6,850	60.14	4,541	39.86	11,391	1,264	12,655	54,762	23.11
Réunion	95,298	40.01	142,871	59.99	238,169	14,472	252,641	471,155	53.62
Saint Pierre and Miquelon	1,139	62.69	678	37.31	1,817	62	1,879	4,805	39.11
Mayotte	17,585	86.46	2,754	13.54	20,339	713	21,052	55,904	37.66
Wallis and Futuna	4,772	89.67	550	10.33	5,322	45	5,367	10,385	51.68
French Polynesia	30,649	72.88	11,404	27.12	42,053	696	42,749	157,044	27.22
New Caledonia	35,948	78.77	9,691	21.23	45,639	1,349	46,988	135,217	34.75
Source: European Election Database

== Aftermath ==
The possible consequences of a "No" vote were highly debated in France before the referendum. Proponents of the Constitution, including Jacques Chirac, claimed that France's standing in Europe would be considerably weakened.

Pro-EU campaigners for a "No" vote (as opposed to those opposing the EU altogether) argue that the Constitution will be renegotiated. "No" vote campaigners, particularly the prominent socialist Laurent Fabius, have labelled this option Plan B. Campaigners for a "Yes" vote have stated that there would be no such Plan B and that the 'European project' could be brought to a standstill for at least ten years.

The perspective of renegotiation quickly appeared illusory after the result of the referendum. First, the challenge of renegotiation was made all the greater by the diversity of reasons for the rejection of the treaty.

Prime Minister Jean-Pierre Raffarin was quickly replaced by Dominique de Villepin. UMP leader Nicolas Sarkozy returned to the cabinet as Minister of the Interior.

This rejection, coupled with similar result in the Dutch referendum, seriously damaged the legitimacy of the Constitution; nevertheless, subsequent EU Presidency holders vowed to keep it going.

Sarkozy was elected President of the French Republic in May 2007. Amongst his pledges was a renegotiation and ratification of a treaty (rather than a constitution) without a referendum. Eventually, the new version of the text, the Lisbon Treaty, was voted by the Parliament.

On the internal political scene, the success of the referendum did not have the expected effect on the political landscape. Begrudged by the members of the Socialist Party for his divisive role, Laurent Fabius lost the race to the presidential primaries for the 2007 elections, finishing third (18.66%) behind Segolene Royal (60.65%) and Dominique Strauss-Kahn (20.83%). The proponents of the Yes eventually got the upper hand in the party, and the lasting division of the far left prevented the apparition of a strong opposition force on left of the Socialist Party by the proponents of the No. On the right of the political spectrum, the far right did not benefit from the success of the No and suffered, for the first time in 15 years a strong decline in the 2007 elections.

== See also ==
- Polish plumber
- Frexit
