= 2005 Dutch European Constitution referendum =

- 1 June 2005
- Are you For or Against approval by the Netherlands of the treaty establishing a constitution for Europe?

Results
Choice	Votes	%
Yes	2,940,730	38.46%
No	4,705,685	61.54%
Valid votes	7,646,415	99.24%
Invalid or blank votes	58,781	0.76%
Total votes	7,705,196	100.00%
Eligible to vote/turnout	12,172,740	63.3%
Results by municipality Yes	No

A consultative referendum on the Treaty establishing a Constitution for Europe was held in the Netherlands on 1 June 2005 to decide whether the government should ratify the proposed Constitution of the European Union. The result was a "No" vote.

The vote was the first national referendum for over two hundred years, and was not binding on the government, meaning that despite the electorate rejecting the Constitution it could theoretically still be ratified by the States-General. The government did say, however, that it would abide by a decisive result, provided turnout exceeded 30%. Official results say that 61.6% of voters rejected the Constitution, on a turnout of 63.3%.

The question put to voters was:

Bent u voor of tegen instemming door Nederland met het Verdrag tot vaststelling van een grondwet voor Europa?

[Are you For or Against approval by the Netherlands of the treaty establishing a constitution for Europe?]

The possible answers were voor (For) or tegen (Against). At some polling stations in the larger cities it was also possible to cast a blank ballot. The latter did not count for the result, but allowed voters to make an affirmative abstention.

The referendum came just three days after the French referendum on the Constitution resulted in its rejection. Because all EU member states needed to ratify the treaty for it to take effect, some regarded the Dutch referendum as irrelevant. However, Dutch campaigners for a "Yes" vote appealed to the electorate to avoid damaging the Netherlands' standing in Europe in the way that the French result was perceived, in some quarters, to have weakened the position of France. Before the plebiscite, many "No" campaigners expressed the view that French rejection of the treaty would encourage Dutch voters to follow suit. A second "No" vote in a referendum in another of the founding countries of the European Communities was widely regarded as having the power to "kill off" the treaty. Opinion polls in the days leading up to the referendum gave the "No" campaign a clear lead.

== Debate in Parliament ==
The bill that led to the referendum was drafted by Members of the Dutch parliament: Farah Karimi (GreenLeft), Niesco Dubbelboer (Dutch Labour Party) and Boris van der Ham (D66). The government was not in favor of this bill. During and after the debate about the bill several political parties made clear how they would act with the different possible outcomes of the referendum. While the referendum was officially non-binding most parties were willing to follow the outcome.

== Campaign ==
The governing and major opposition parties, making up 80 percent of the country's members of parliament, all backed the Constitution, along with the major newspapers. The parties of the coalition—Christian Democratic Appeal, People's Party for Freedom and Democracy, and Democrats 66—all campaigned for a "Yes" vote, as did the opposition Labour Party and GreenLeft. The Socialist Party, Pim Fortuyn List, Group Wilders, Reformed Political Party and ChristianUnion all campaigned for a "No" vote.

The result is notable, since the largest party to campaign a "No" was the Socialist Party, with 6 percent of the votes during the last elections. The "Yes" campaign was supported by all major parties (most of which were before and directly after the no-vote at loss in the polls).

Opinion polls in the months before the vote tended to show the public split on the issue, with the "No" campaign taking a clear lead as the referendum approached; but as many as half of the electorate admitted to having little or no knowledge of the contents and provisions of the Constitution.

A popular Internet vote test called Referendumwijzer was launched on 21 April, but critics argued that it was biased towards the Constitution, pointing out that even those most strongly against the treaty were receiving results in favour of it because of questions regarding democracy and the environment which were not necessarily relevant to the Constitution. Television broadcasts by the "Yes" campaign provoked controversy for raising the spectre of war and chaos in Europe if the Constitution was rejected. The most emotive of the adverts, which featured emotive images of the Holocaust and Srebrenica Massacre, were never aired by the "Yes" campaign, but received national news coverage and were received very poorly.

A TNS–NIPO poll on 19 May indicated that 38% of people intended to vote, with 27% in favour, and 54% against the Constitution. A poll by the same organisation on 30 May—two days before the referendum—concluded that 58% of those who intended to vote would reject the treaty. As the referendum approached, many "Yes" campaigners began to predict defeat, and some even expressed relief after the French rejection of the treaty, taking the view that this would prevent the Netherlands from being the first or only country to obstruct the course of ratification, even though they also expressed dismay that the French result had given the "No" campaign greater legitimacy and acceptance, and had suggested to the public that the Netherlands' standing in Europe would not be significantly damaged by a "No" vote, with some going as far as saying that the Netherlands would look like a fool in front of the rest of Europe.

== Results ==
Choice	Votes	%
For	2,940,730	38.46
Against	4,705,685	61.54
Total	7,646,415	100.00
Valid votes	7,646,415	99.24
Invalid/blank votes	58,781	0.76
Total votes	7,705,196	100.00
Registered voters/turnout	12,172,740	63.30
Source: Kiesraad

=== By region ===
Region	For	Against	Turnout	Valid votes	Invalid votes
Groningen	34.53	65.47	64.64	63.93	0.71
Friesland	38.09	61.91	66.09	65.67	0.42
Drenthe	35.79	64.21	65.20	64.65	0.55
Overijssel	36.57	63.43	64.40	63.98	0.42
Gelderland	38.00	62.00	64.66	64.16	0.50
Flevoland	32.28	67.72	64.53	64.19	0.35
Utrecht	43.80	56.20	67.89	67.22	0.66
North Holland	39.85	60.15	63.96	63.48	0.48
South Holland	37.20	62.80	62.55	62.05	0.50
Zeeland	32.51	67.49	65.47	65.11	0.36
North Brabant	40.98	59.02	59.05	58.64	0.42
Limburg	38.32	61.68	60.79	60.42	0.37

Only in 26 of the 467 Dutch municipalities was there a majority on the subject. In 446 municipalities, the majority voted against. Local context such as the average disposable income, unemployment rate, the percentage of non-Western immigrants and the address density were associated with local differences in referendum outcome.

Municipalities with the largest share of "No" voters:

- Urk (91.6%)
- Reiderland (84.6%)
- Staphorst (83.6%)

Municipalities with the largest share of "Yes" voters:

- Bloemendaal (60.6%)
- Bennebroek (55.3%)
- Bunnik (52.8%)

== Reasons for rejection ==
According to a poll by Maurice de Hond, 30% of the Constitution's opponents used the referendum as an opportunity to demonstrate their dissatisfaction with the government, instead of confining their deliberations to the contents of the treaty that was put before them. At the time of the referendum, the Netherlands' centre-right coalition government, led by Jan Peter Balkenende, was suffering a period of unpopularity as it tried to push through cuts in public spending, and there was widespread disillusion with the country's political elite.

Some matters relating to the European Union that motivated the "No" vote were also not strictly connected to the provisions of the Constitution. The debate over the accession of Turkey to the European Union, as well as countries of Eastern Europe, led to fears of an increase in immigration, or an outsourcing of jobs to new member states. Furthermore, the Netherlands had not held a referendum on the euro, and amidst concern that its adoption had led to an increase in the cost of living (combined with Dutch citizens' status as the largest net per capita contributors to the EU), around 30% of the voters took the opportunity to "take revenge" on the political establishment for seeking to advance European integration in a manner that did not engage the public to the extent that it could have done.

A larger group of voters, however, voted "No" for reasons that were connected to the Constitution itself. 48% thought the new Constitution was worse than the existing treaties, and 44% cited the declining influence of the Netherlands in the EU, with the treaty as an important motivation. Linked to this was a fear of being dominated by the powerhouses of the European Union (particularly the United Kingdom, France and Germany). The perception of an aggressive and ruthless style on the part of the "Yes" campaign also put off many. The Minister of Justice, Piet Hein Donner, warned that a rejection would raise the chances of war and stated that "the C in CDA [for 'Christian'] implies that you vote in favour of the constitution." The Minister for Economic Affairs, Laurens Jan Brinkhorst, said that "the lights would go off" in the case of a rejection and that the Netherlands would become "the Switzerland of Europe." The People's Party for Freedom and Democracy withdrew a controversial television broadcast, in which rejection was connected with the Holocaust, the genocide in Srebrenica and the terrorist attacks on March 11, 2004 in Madrid. This seriously damaged the "Yes" campaign.
