= European Years =

Connecting Europe Express in Ulm, Germany, as part of the European Year of Rail 2021

Every year, the European Union chooses to address a subject in order to encourage debate and dialogue within and between member states raising the awareness of European citizens to a specific problem.

== History ==
Since 1983, the European Parliament and Council, based on European Commission proposals, have designated annual themes. These "European Years" aim to educate citizens and engage national governments on particular topics, driving attitude and behavioral changes at both national and European levels.

== Years ==
Year	Name	Acronym	Ref.
2023 & 2024	European Year of Skills	EYS	
2022	European Year of Youth	EYY	
2021	European Year of Rail	EYR	
2018	European Year of Cultural Heritage	EYCH	
2017	None		
2016	None		
2015	European Year for Development	EYD	
2014	European Year of Citizens	EYC	
2013	European Year of Citizens	EYC	
2012	European Year for Active Ageing	EYAA	
2011	European Year of Volunteering	EYV	
2010	European Year for Combating Poverty and Social Exclusion	EYCPSE	
2009	European Year of Creativity and Innovation	EYCI	
2008	European Year of Intercultural Dialogue	EYID	
2007	European Year of Equal Opportunities for All	EYEOA	
2006	European Year of Workers' Mobility	EYWM	
2005	European Year of Citizenship through Education	EYCE	
2004	European Year of Education through Sport	EYES	
2003	European Year of People with Disabilities	EYPD	
2002	None		
2001	European Year of Languages	EYL	
2000	None		
1999	European Year of Action to Combat Violence Against Women		
1998	European Year of Local and Regional Democracy		
1997	European Year against Racism and Xenophobia		
1996	European Year of Lifelong Learning		
1995	European Year of Road Safety and Young Drivers		
1994	European Year of Nutrition and Health		
1993	European Year of the Elderly and of Solidarity between Generations		
1992	European Year of Safety, Hygiene and Health Protection at Work		
1991	None		
1990	European Year of Tourism		
1989	European Year of Information on Cancer		
1988	European Year of Cinema and Television		
1987	European Year of the Environment		
1986	European Year of Road Safety		
1985	European Year of Music		
1984	European Year for a People's Europe		
1983	European Year of SMEs and the Craft Industry		
