= 2003 in the European Union =

- Decades: 1980s; 1990s; 2000s; 2010s; 2020s
- See also: Other events of 2003; Timeline of EU history

Events from the year 2003 in the European Union.

The year was designated the European Year of People with Disabilities by the Council of Europe.

== Incumbents ==
- Commission President – Romano Prodi
- Council Presidency – Greece (January–June) and Italy (July–December)
- Parliament President – Pat Cox, ELDR Party
- High Representative – Javier Solana, Socialists

== Events ==
=== January ===
- 1 January - Greece takes over the Presidency of the European Union.

=== February ===
- 1 February - The Treaty of Nice enters into force.

=== March ===
- 8 March - In the first of many referendums held across Europe this year, the electorate of Malta votes to join the European Union.
- 23 March - The electorate of Slovenia votes to join the European Union.

=== April ===
- 9 April - The European Parliament approves the accession of Cyprus, the Czech Republic, Estonia, Hungary, Latvia, Lithuania, Malta, Poland, Slovakia and Slovenia, who are expected to join the EU the following year subject to the result of national referendums.
- 12 April - Amid a lower than expected turnout, the electorate of Hungary votes to join the European Union.
- 16 April - The Treaty of Accession 2003 is signed in Athens by the 15 current member nations of the European Union and Cyprus, the Czech Republic, Estonia, Hungary, Latvia, Lithuania, Malta, Poland, Slovakia and Slovenia. At 4,900 pages, it is the longest treaty in EU history.

=== May ===
- 11 May - The electorate of Lithuania votes to join the European Union, becoming the first former Soviet republic to do so.
- 17 May - The electorate of Slovakia votes by a wide margin to join the European Union.

=== June ===
- 8 June - The electorate of Poland votes to join the European Union.
- 14 June - The electorate of the Czech Republic votes to join the European Union.

=== July ===
- 1 July - Italy takes over the Presidency of the European Union.

=== September ===
- 14 September -
  - In a referendum, the electorate of Sweden votes to reject membership of the eurozone.
  - The electorate of Estonia votes to join the European Union.

=== October ===
- 4 October - An Intergovernmental Conference convenes in Rome to finalise the European Constitution.
