= 2001 in the European Union =

- Decades: 1980s; 1990s; 2000s; 2010s; 2020s
- See also: Other events of 2001; Timeline of EU history

Events from the year 2001 in the European Union.

The year was designated the European Year of Languages by the Council of Europe and the European Parliament.

== Incumbents ==
- Commission President — (Italy) Romano Prodi
- Council Presidency — Sweden (January–June), Belgium (July–December)
- Parliament President — (France) Nicole Fontaine
- High Representative — (Spain) Javier Solana

== Events ==
- 1 January -
  - Sweden takes over the Presidency of the European Union.
  - Greece becomes the 12th member of the Eurozone.
- 5 March - The electorate of Switzerland vote by a wide margin against joining negotiations to enter the European Union.
- 7 June - In a referendum, the electorate of Ireland votes against the Treaty of Nice.
- 1 July - Belgium takes over the Presidency of the European Union.
- 3 July - The European Commission blocks the proposed merger between American companies General Electric and Honeywell, the first time European regulators have prevented such a move.
- 20 September - In the wake of the September 11 attacks, anti-terrorism measures such as EU-wide search and arrest warrants and the establishment of an anti-terrorism department within Europol are announced.
- 14 December - Euro coins first go on sale in banks in preparation for its public release into the Eurozone the following month.
