= 1997 in the European Union =

- Decades: 1970s; 1980s; 1990s; 2000s; 2010s
- See also: Other events of 1997; Timeline of EU history

Events from the year 1997 in the European Union.

== Incumbents ==
- (European Union) President of the European Council
  - (Netherlands) Wim Kok (Jan – Jun 1997)
  - (Luxembourg) Jean-Claude Juncker (July – Dec 1997)
- (European Union) Commission President - (Luxembourg) Jacques Santer
- (European Union) Council Presidency - Netherlands (Jan – Jun 1997) and Luxembourg (July – Dec 1997)

== Events ==
- 1 January: Netherlands takes over the Presidency of the European Union.
- 30 March - Euronat, a nationalist European political alliance is founded. It was led by the French National Front (FN). It will be dissolved by 2009.
- 1 July: Luxembourg takes over the Presidency of the European Union.
