= 1999 in the European Union =

- Decades: 1970s; 1980s; 1990s; 2000s; 2010s
- See also: Other events of 1999; Timeline of EU history

Events from the year 1999 in the European Union.

== Incumbents ==
- (European Union) President of the European Council
  - (Germany) Gerhard Schröder (Jan – Jun 1999)
  - (Finland) Paavo Lipponen (July – Dec 1999)
- (European Union) Commission President -
  - (Luxembourg) Jacques Santer (to 15 Mar 1999)
  - (Spain) Manuel Marín (15 Mar-17 Sep 1999)
  - (Italy) Romano Prodi (from 17 Sep 1999)
- (European Union) Council Presidency - Germany (Jan – Jun 1999) and Finland (July – Dec 1999)

== Events ==
- 1 January: Germany takes over the Presidency of the European Union and the euro is officially launched as a currency in Austria, Belgium, Finland, France, Germany, Ireland, Italy, Luxembourg, the Netherlands, Portugal and Spain.
- 14 January: The European Parliament votes to establish a 'Committee of Independent Experts' to review the issue of fraud in the European Commission (see Santer Commission).
- 18 January: Jan Karlsson is elected President of the European Court of Auditors.
- 15 March: The Committee of Independent Experts produces its report citing fraud and mismanagement in the Commission. Parliament withdraws its support from the executive and the Santer Commission is forced to resign en masse.
- 24 March: The European Council in Berlin agrees on Romano Prodi as the next President of the European Commission and adopts foreign policy regarding Kosovo, the Middle East and South Africa.
- 15–16 April: Third Euro-Mediterranean conference held in Stuttgart (Germany), including Libya.
- 23 April: Council adopts foreign policy on banning petroleum and petroleum products to Serbia.
- 26 April: Council adopts measures to aid refugees fleeing Kosovo.
- 5 May: Parliament approves Romano Prodi as Commission President.
- 3–4 June: The European Council in Cologne (Germany) adopts foreign policy positions on Russia and Kosovo. Javier Solana is designated the High Representative for the Common Foreign and Security Policy and Secretary-General of the Council of the European Union. The European Employment Pact is adopted and the brief for the Charter of Fundamental Rights of the European Union is laid down.
- 10–13 June: 1999 European Parliament elections are held producing a majority for the European People's Party for the first time since elections began.
- 18 June: OLAF is established.
- 1 July: Finland takes over the Presidency of the European Union.
- 20 July: Nicole Fontaine is elected President of the European Parliament.
- 30 August: Parliament begins hearings of the proposed new European Commissioners (lasts until 7 September)
- 15 September: Parliament approves the Prodi Commission.
- 3 October: The Freedom Party of Austria (FPÖ) and the Austrian People's Party (ÖVP) form a government in Austria after the 1999 Austrian legislative election. Due to this Having threatened a diplomatic boycott of Austria, fourteen European Union (EU) countries introduced sanctions after the government had been formed; other than formal EU meetings, contacts with Austria were reduced. The measures were justified by the EU, which stated that "the admission of the FPÖ into a coalition government legitimises the extreme right in Europe."
- 15–16 October: The European Council, held in Tampere (Finland), reaches agreement on immigration and justice guidelines. Procedures on drafting the Charter of Fundamental Rights are laid down.
- 19 October: First Annual Report on Human Right is published by the Council.
- 10–11 December: The European Council, meeting in Helsinki (Finland) open accession negotiations with Romania, Slovakia, Latvia, Lithuania, Bulgaria and Malta and recognise Turkey as a candidate.
