= 1996 in the European Union =

- Decades: 1970s; 1980s; 1990s; 2000s; 2010s
- See also: Other events of 1996; Timeline of EU history

Events from the year 1996 in the European Union.

== Incumbents ==
- (European Union) President of the European Council
  - (Italy) Lamberto Dini (Jan – May 1996)
  - (Italy) Romano Prodi (May – Jun 1996)
  - (Republic of Ireland) John Bruton (July – Dec 1996)
- (European Union) Commission President
  - (Luxembourg) Jacques Santer
- (European Union) Council Presidency
  - Italy (Jan – Jun 1996)
  - (Republic of Ireland) Ireland (July – Dec 1996)

== Events ==
=== January ===
- 1 January
  - Italy takes over the Presidency of the European Union.
  - A Customs Union between the EU and Turkey enters into force.
- 17 January – The Czech Republic formally applies to join the European Union.
- 18 January – Mr Bernhard Friedmann is elected president of the Court of Auditors.
- 31 January – The Commission adopts a Green Paper on review of Merger Control Regulation.

=== February ===
- 1 February – The interim agreements with Russia and Ukraine enter into force.
- 26 February – A Euro-Mediterranean association agreement is signed with Morocco.

=== March ===
- 1–2 March – A European Union-Asia summit is held in Bangkok, Thailand.
- 5 March – "Brasserie du pêcheur" and "Factortame" rulings. The European Court of Justice specifies when a Member State violating Community law can be held responsible for the damages caused to a private individual.
- 6 March – The Commission adopts a White Paper on air traffic control and a Green Paper on legal protection for encrypted services.
- 27 March – The Commission adopts a decision on urgent measures to be taken for protection against BSE (Bovine Spongiform Encephalopathy). It imposes a worldwide export ban on British beef and beef products.
- 29 March – The opening of the Intergovernmental Conference to revise the Maastricht Treaty is held in Turin, Italy. The European Council defines its agenda.

=== April ===
- 1–2 April – A G7 conference on employment is held in Lille, France.
- 19–20 April – A G7+1 meeting on nuclear safety is held in Moscow, Russia.
- 22 April – The European Union signs partnership and co-operation agreements with Georgia, Armenia and Azerbaijan.

=== May ===
- 8 May – The Commission adopts a Green Paper on commercial communications in the single market.
- 13 May – The Council adopts an EU action plan for Russia.
- 22 May – The Commission adopts a Green Paper on financial services.
- 23 May – Hedley Lomas ruling. The European Court of Justice affirms that a Member State violating Community law by refusing to issue an export licence to a private individual must pay compensation.

=== June ===
- 1 June – The cooperation agreements with Vietnam and Nepal enter into force.
- 10 June – Slovenia formally applies to join the European Union.
- 14–15 June – A tripartite conference on Growth and Employment involving the Community institutions, the Member States and the social partners is held in Rome, Italy.
- 21 June – The cooperation agreements with Uzbekistan and Chile are signed.
- 21–22 June – A European Council is held in Florence, Italy. It spells out the objectives and the agenda of the Intergovernmental Conference (IGC), it endorses the framework plan presented by the Commission for eradication of bovine spongiform encephalopathy (BSE) and resolves the problem of the Court of Justice's authority to interpret the Europol Convention.
- 25 June – The Council adopts the new TACIS regulation on assistance to New Independent States and Mongolia for 1996-1999.
- 27–29 June – A G7 summit is held in Lyon, France. Three documents are adopted: a declaration on terrorism, an economic communiqué entitled "Making a success of globalisation for the benefit of all" and a statement from the chair entitled "Towards greater security and stability in a more cooperative world".

=== July ===
- 1 July – Ireland takes over the Presidency of the European Union.
- 24 July – The Commission adopts a Green Paper entitled "Living and working in the information society: people first" and a Green Paper on the role, position and liability of the statutory auditor.
- 25 July – The Council adopts a regulation concerning the aids granted for the reconstruction of the republics of former Yugoslavia.
- 30 July – The Commission adopts a White Paper on the strategy to follow for revitalising EU railway.

=== September ===
- 16–17 September – Following the world solar summit held in Harare, Zimbabwe, participants launch a world solar programme for 1996-2005.
- 27 September – The 15 European Union Member States sign a convention on extradition and a protocol on protection of the European Union's financial interests. The Council adopts the corresponding acts.

=== October ===
- 1 October – The Council agrees on a Community action for a total ban on anti-personnel landmines.
- 2 October – The Commission adopts a Green Paper entitled "Education, Training and research: the obstacles to Trans-national mobility".
- 5 October – A Special European Council is held in Dublin, Ireland. heads of state or government confirm the timetable for the Intergovernmental Conference (IGC).
- 13 October – Austria holds European Parliament elections for the first time.
- 14 October – The Finnish Mark joins the EMS exchange rate mechanism.
- 20 October – Finland holds European Parliament elections for the first time.
- 28 October – A cooperation agreement is signed between the European Union and the Republic of Korea.

=== November ===
- 4 November – The Commission adopts a Green Paper on the future noise policy.
- 7–9 November – A European Conference on rural development is held in Cork, Ireland.
- 11 November – The Council adopts a common action for sustaining the democratic process in Zaire, Africa.
- 20 November – The Commission adopts three Green Papers on the relations between the European Union and the African, Caribbean, Pacific (ACP) states, a numbering policy for telecommunication services, a Community strategy for developing renewable energies.
- 25 November – The Italian Lira re-enters the EMS exchange rate mechanism.
- 27 November – The Commission adopts a Green Paper on public procurement in the European Union.

=== December ===
- 4–5 December – At the London Conference centred on implementing peace agreements in Former Yugoslavia, a plan to consolidate peace is adopted.
- 9–13 December – The World Trade Organization (WTO) Ministerial conference is held in Singapore and concludes with an agreement on information technology products.
- 10 December – The Euro-Mediterranean interim agreement with the Palestine Liberation Organisation (PLO) is signed.
- 13–14 December – A European Council is held in Dublin, Ireland. It reaches agreement on the various elements necessary for introduction of the single currency (legal framework, stability pact, new exchange rate mechanism), adopts the Dublin declaration on employment and confirms timetable for the Intergovernmental Conference (IGC).
- 16 December – A Transatlantic summit between the European Union and the USA is held in Washington, USA.
- 19 December – Denmark, Finland and Sweden sign the Schengen agreement.

== European Capitals of Culture ==
The European Capital of Culture is a city designated by the European Union for a period of one calendar year, during which it organises a series of cultural events with a strong European dimension.

- Copenhagen, Denmark

== See also ==
- History of the European Union
- Timeline of European Union history
