= 2008 in the European Union =

- Decades: 1980s; 1990s; 2000s; 2010s; 2020s
- See also: Other events of 2008; Timeline of EU history

Events in the year 2008 in the European Union.

2008 was designated as:

- European Year of Intercultural Dialogue

== Incumbents ==
- (European Union) President of the European Council
  - (Slovenia) Janez Janša (Jan – Jun 2008)
  - (France) Nicolas Sarkozy (July – Dec 2008)
- (European Union) Commission President
  - (Portugal) José Manuel Barroso
- (European Union) Council Presidency:
  - Slovenia (January – June)
  - France (July - December)
- (European Union) Parliament President
  - (Germany) Hans-Gert Pöttering
- (European Union) High Representative
  - (Spain) Javier Solana

== Events ==
- 1 January - Cyprus and Malta join the eurozone.
- 1 January - Akrotiri and Dhekelia adopt the euro.
- 1 January - Slovenia starts the presidency of European Union as the first of new member states.
- 29 March - Czech Republic, Estonia, Hungary, Latvia, Lithuania, Malta, Poland, Slovakia and Slovenia implement the Schengen Agreement for airports.
- 1 July - France takes over the Presidency from Slovenia.
- 12 December - Switzerland joins the Schengen area.
