= 1998 in the European Union =

- Decades: 1970s; 1980s; 1990s; 2000s; 2010s
- See also: Other events of 1998; Timeline of EU history

Events from the year 1998 in the European Union.

== Incumbents ==
- (European Union) President of the European Council
  - (United Kingdom) Tony Blair (Jan – Jun 1998)
  - (Austria) Viktor Klima (July – Dec 1998)
- (European Union) Commission President - (Luxembourg) Jacques Santer
- (European Union) Council Presidency - United Kingdom (Jan – Jun 1998) and Austria (July – Dec 1998)

== Events ==
- 1 January: The United Kingdom takes over the Presidency of the European Union.
- 16 March: The Greek drachma enters the European Exchange Rate Mechanism.
- 25 March: A convergence report is adopted by the European Commission which recommends that 11 member states (the EU-15 minus Denmark, Greece, Sweden and the United Kingdom) adopt the euro on 1 January 1999.
- 30 March: Accession process launched at a ministerial meeting with Bulgaria, Cyprus, Czech Republic, Estonia, Hungary, Latvia, Lithuania, Poland, Romania, Slovakia and Slovenia.
- 3–4 April: Second Europe-Asia summit, held in London.
- 28 April: The European Court of Justice rules that EU nationals may obtain medical treatment in any state and be reimbursed according to the state in which they are insured (the Kohll vs "Union des Caisses de Maladie" and Decker vs "Caisse de Maladie des Employés Privés" ruling).
- 29 April: The European Community and the EU member states sign the Kyoto Protocol.
- 3 May: The European Council, meeting in Brussels, approves the 11 member states outlined in the Commission report which will adopt the euro in 1999. Following this, they agree to regulations on technical issues regarding the coins and the central bank governors. The Commission and Monetary Institute set the conditions for irrevocable conversion rates for the euro.
- 26 May: The member states adopting the euro appoint the first president, vice president and executive board members of the European Central Bank.
- 1 June: The European Central Bank is established, succeeding the Monetary Institute.
- 15–16 June: European Council in Cardiff (UK) on economic growth.
- 1 July: Austria takes over the Presidency of the European Union.
- 11–12 December: European Council in Vienna (Austria) adopts employment guidelines, agrees external representation for the euro and adopts an action plan for the establishment of an area of freedom, security and justice.
- 17 December: The European Parliament denies approval for implementation of the 1996 EU budget (see Santer Commission)
