= 2000 in the European Union =

- Decades: 1980s; 1990s; 2000s; 2010s; 2020s
- See also: Other events of 2000; Timeline of EU history

Events from the year 2000 in the European Union.

== Incumbents ==
- (European Union) President of the European Council
  - (Portugal) António Guterres (Jan – Jun 2000)
  - (France) Jacques Chirac (July – Dec 2000)
- (European Union) Commission President - (Italy) Romano Prodi
- (European Union) Council Presidency - Portugal (Jan – Jun 2000) and France (July – Dec 2000)

== Events ==
- 1 January - Portugal takes over the Presidency of the European Union.
- 3 May - The European Commission recommends that Greece become the 12th member of the Eurozone.
- 1 July - France takes over the Presidency of the European Union.
- 28 September - In a referendum, the electorate of Denmark votes against membership of the Euro.
