= 2011 in the European Union =

- Decades: 1990s; 2000s; 2010s; 2020s
- See also: Other events of 2011; Timeline of EU history

Events in the year 2011 in the European Union.

== Incumbents ==
- (European Union) President of the European Council – (Belgium) Herman Van Rompuy
- (European Union) Commission President – (Portugal) José Manuel Barroso
- (European Union) Council Presidency – Hungary (Jan–Jun 2011) and Poland (Jul–Dec 2011)
- (European Union) Parliament President – (Poland) Jerzy Buzek
- (European Union) High Representative – (United Kingdom) Catherine Ashton

== Events ==
=== January ===
- January 1
  - Hungary takes over the Presidency of the Council of the European Union from Belgium.
  - Estonia officially adopts the Euro currency and becomes the seventeenth Eurozone country.
  - Lithuania receives chairmanship of Organization for Security and Co-operation in Europe.

=== February ===
- February 25 – EU ban on BPA in baby bottles enters into force.

=== March ===
- March 15 – Council Implementing Regulation (EU) No. 282/2011 is adopted.

=== July ===
- July 1 – Poland takes over the Presidency of the Council of the European Union from Hungary.

== Other ==
- In 2011, Tallinn and Turku are designated as European capitals of culture by the European Union.
