= 2002 in the European Union =

- Decades: 1980s; 1990s; 2000s; 2010s; 2020s
- See also: Other events of 2002; Timeline of EU history

Events from the year 2002 in the European Union.

== Incumbents ==
- Commission President — Romano Prodi
- Council Presidency — Spain (January–June), Denmark (July–December)
- Parliament President — Nicole Fontaine (until 15 January), Pat Cox
- High Representative — Javier Solana

== Events ==
- 1 January -
  - Spain takes over the Presidency of the European Union.
  - Euro notes and coins issued are in Austria, Belgium, France, Finland, Germany, Greece, Ireland, Italy, Luxembourg, the Netherlands, Portugal and Spain.
- 15 January - Irish MEP Pat Cox is elected President of the European Parliament.
- 28 February - The Euro becomes the sole legal tender in all 12 Eurozone countries.
- 21 April – first round of the presidential election: Jacques Chirac and Jean-Marie le Pen poll the most votes. This was a major political event, both nationally and internationally, as it was the first time someone like Le Pen with such far-right views had qualified for the second round of a French presidential election. Two weeks of demonstrations against the National Front follow.
- 5 May – second round of the presidential election. Jacques Chirac returns for a second term as President of the French Republic.
- 31 May - All 15 member nations of the European Union ratify the Kyoto Protocol, committing to an 8% cut in carbon dioxide emissions between 2008 and 2012 compared to 1990 levels.
- 1 July - Denmark takes over the Presidency of the European Union.
- 19 October - In a second referendum, the electorate of Ireland votes in favour of ratifying the Treaty of Nice.
- November - The European Christian Political Party (ECPP), a European political party is founded in Lakitelek, Hungary.
