= 2005 in the European Union =

- Decades: 1980s; 1990s; 2000s; 2010s; 2020s
- See also: Other events of 2005; Timeline of EU history

Events from the year 2005 in the European Union.

== Incumbents ==
- (European Union) President of the European Council
  - (Luxembourg) Jean-Claude Juncker (Jan – Jun 2005)
  - (United Kingdom) Tony Blair (July – Dec 2005)
- (European Union) Commission President
  - (Portugal) José Manuel Barroso
- (European Union) Council Presidency
  - Luxembourg (January–June)
  - The United Kingdom (July–December)
- (European Union) Parliament President
  - (Spain) Josep Borrell
- (European Union) High Representative
  - (Spain) Javier Solana

== Events ==
=== January ===
- 1 January: Luxembourg takes the Presidency of the Council of the European Union.
- 26 January: The Commission's strategic objectives outlined as: "Prosperity, Solidarity and Security."

=== February ===
- 1 February – European Constitution: The lower chamber of the Slovenian Parliament, the National Assembly (Slovene: Državni zbor) ratifies a European Union constitution proposal, with 79 votes to 4. Thus, Slovenia becomes the third European Union state to ratify it.
- 16 February: The Kyoto Protocol enters into force.
- 20 February – European Constitution: Spain approves a European Constitution proposal by referendum.

=== April ===
- 6 April – European Constitution: The upper house of the Italian Parliament ratifies the European Constitution proposal with 217 votes to 16, after its lower house approved the proposal in January.
- 19 April – European Constitution: The Hellenic Parliament ratifies the European Constitution proposal with 268 votes in favour, 17 against and 15 abstentions. Greece becomes the sixth member state of the European Union to approve the constitution proposal.

=== May ===
2005 French European Constitution referendum

- 26 May – European Constitution: France rejects a European Constitution proposal by referendum.

2005 Dutch European Constitution referendum

=== June ===
- 1 June – European Constitution: The Netherlands rejects a European Constitution proposal by referendum. The referendum was consultative, and was not legally binding.

=== July ===
- 1 July: The United Kingdom takes the Presidency.
- 7 July: Terrorist attack in London
- 10 July – European Constitution: Luxembourg approves a European Constitution proposition by referendum.

=== September ===
- 30 September: Jyllands-Posten publishes a series of cartoons which were found insulting by Muslim groups triggering protests and attacks against Europe such as the storming of a Commission office.

=== October ===
- 3 October: Accession negotiations start with Croatia and Turkey.
- Informal summit of EU leaders held in Hampton Court Palace in west London.

=== December ===
- 18 December: WTO talks in Hong Kong fail to conclude the Doha Development Agenda.

== See also ==
- History of the European Union
- Timeline of European Union history
