= 2009 in the European Union =

- Decades: 1980s; 1990s; 2000s; 2010s; 2020s
- See also: Other events of 2009; Timeline of EU history

Events in the year 2009 in the European Union.

== Incumbents ==
- (European Union) President of the European Council
  - (Czech Republic) Mirek Topolánek (Jan – May 2009)
  - (Czech Republic) Jan Fischer (May – Jun 2009)
  - (Sweden) Fredrik Reinfeldt (July – Dec 2009)
- (European Union) Commission President -
  - (Portugal) José Manuel Barroso
- (European Union) Council Presidency - Czech Republic (Jan – Jun 2009) and Sweden (July – Dec 2009)
- (European Union) High Representative
  - (Spain) Javier Solana (to 1 December 2009)
  - (United Kingdom) Catherine Ashton (from 1 December 2009)

== Events ==
=== January ===
- January 1 - Czech Republic assumes the Presidency for the first time.
- January 1 - Slovakia adopts the euro and becomes the 16th member of the Eurozone.
- January 1 - Deadline by which goods in all member states of the European Union must be sold in metric units (this has already been completed everywhere, except in the United Kingdom). Road signs in the UK are unaffected (road signs in all other member states are already in metric units).

=== February ===
- February 14 - Lithuania celebrates the millennium of its name.

=== May ===
- May 7 - Inauguration of the Eastern Partnership in Prague.

=== June ===
- June 4–7 - The 2009 European Parliament election takes place, the exact date varying depending on country. European People's Party form the largest group.
- June 7 - A referendum on changing the Act of Succession is held in Denmark.

=== July ===
- July 1 - Sweden takes over the Presidency.

=== September ===
- September 16 - President Barroso confirmed for second term by Parliament (382 to 219 with 117 abstaining)
- September 17 - Extraordinary European Council meeting in Brussels to prepare for G20 meeting.

=== October ===
- October 2 - The electorate of Ireland votes to ratify the Treaty of Lisbon.
- October 4 - Parliamentary elections in Greece.
- October 24 - The Alliance of European National Movements (AENM), a European political party is founded. AENM's founding members were Hungary's Jobbik, France's National Front, Italy's Tricolour Flame, Sweden's National Democrats and Belgium's National Front.
- October 29–30 - European Council meeting in Brussels.

=== November ===
- November 22 - Presidential elections in Romania.

=== December ===
- December 1 - The Treaty of Lisbon comes into force.
- December 6 - Presidential elections run-off round in Romania

== Deaths ==
- February 27 - Manea Mănescu, former Romanian Prime Minister (born 1916)
