= 2012 in the European Union =

- Decades: 1990s; 2000s; 2010s; 2020s
- See also: Other events of 2012; Timeline of EU history

Events in the year 2012 in the European Union.

== Incumbents ==
- (European Union) President of the European Council
  - (Belgium) Herman Van Rompuy
- (European Union) Commission President
  - (Portugal) José Manuel Barroso
- (European Union) Council Presidency
  - Denmark (Jan – Jun 2012)
  - Cyprus (July – Dec 2012)
- (European Union) Parliament President
  - (Germany) Martin Schulz
- (European Union) High Representative
  - (United Kingdom) Catherine Ashton

== Events ==
=== January ===
- 1 January – Denmark takes over the Presidency of the Council of the European Union from Poland.
- 11 January – The European Commission presented its E-Commerce Action Plan.

=== March ===
- 2 March – The Treaty on Stability, Coordination and Governance in the Economic and Monetary Union signed.

=== July ===
- 1 July – Cyprus takes over the Presidency of the Council of the European Union from Denmark.

=== October ===
- The Liikanen report, "Report of the European Commission's High-level Expert Group on Bank Structural Reform", was published.

=== December ===
- 5 December – The antitrust regulators of European Commission fined Philips, LG Electronics, Samsung SDI, Panasonic, Toshiba and Technicolor for price fixing of TV cathode-ray tubes in two cartels.
