= 2004 in the European Union =

- Decades: 1980s; 1990s; 2000s; 2010s; 2020s
- See also: Other events of 2004; Timeline of EU history

Events from the year 2004 in the European Union.

== Incumbents ==
- (European Union) Commission President
  - (Italy) Romano Prodi (to 22 November)
  - (Portugal) José Manuel Barroso (since 22 November)
- (European Union) Council Presidency
  - (Republic of Ireland) Ireland (January–June)
  - The Netherlands (July–December)
- (European Union) Parliament President
  - (Republic of Ireland) Pat Cox (to 30 July)
  - (Spain) Josep Borrell (since 30 July)
- (European Union) High Representative
  - (Spain) Javier Solana

== Events ==
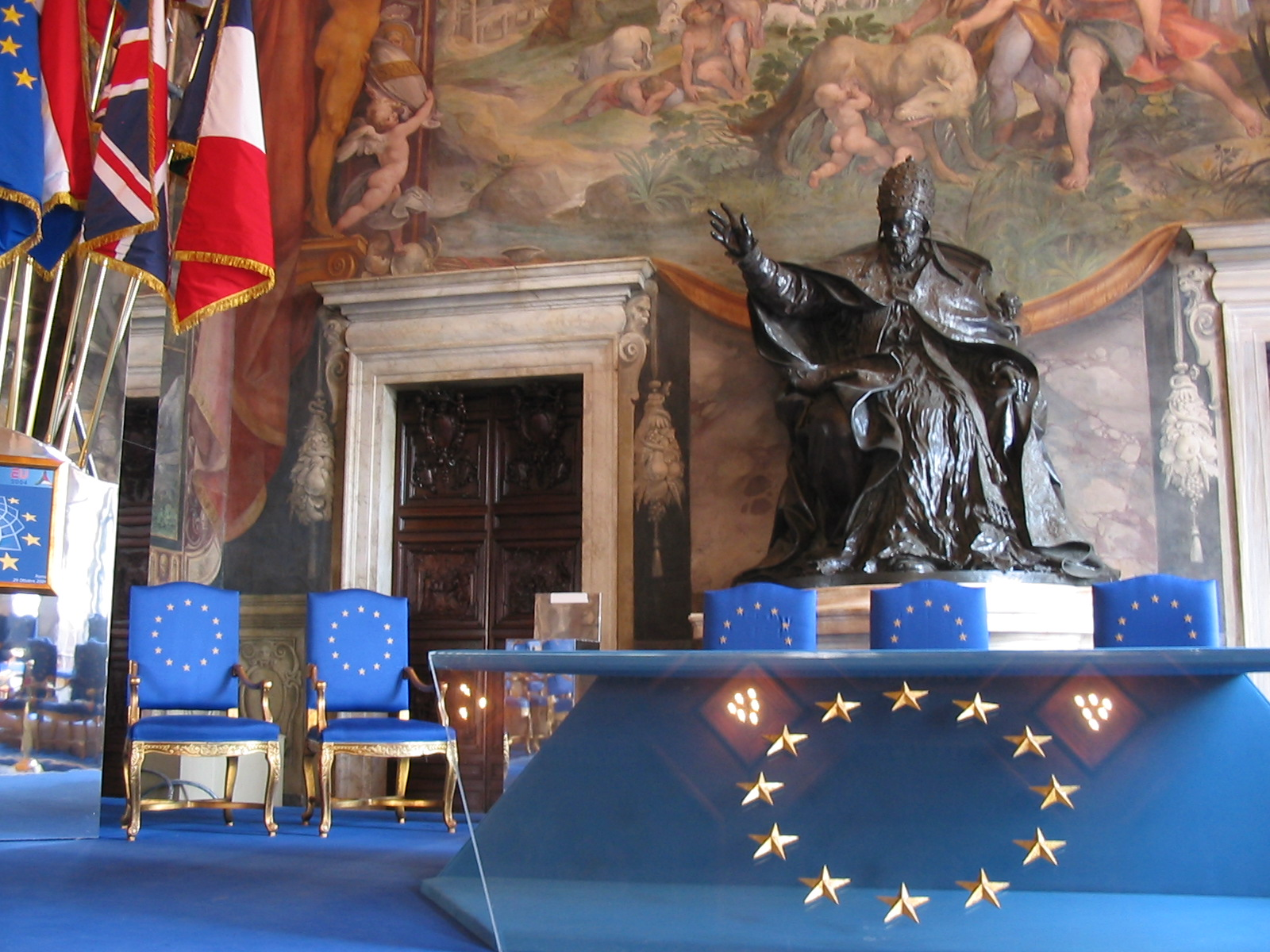
The hall in the Capitoline Museums of Rome, Italy, where the European Constitution was signed.

- 1 May: 2004 Enlargement (Cyprus, Czech Republic, Estonia, Hungary, Latvia, Lithuania, Malta, Poland, Slovakia and Slovenia).
- 10–13 June: 2004 European Parliament election expanding the Commission.
- 22 July: The European Parliament approves José Manuel Barroso as President.
- 29 October: Delegates of the 25 member states sign the European Constitution in Rome.
- 1 November: Original date for Barroso to enter office delayed due to parliamentary opposition to some of his Commissioners. A new college is later submitted.
- 18 November: The European Parliament approves the Barroso Commission.
- 22 November: Barroso Commission took office.
- 16 December: The European Council decides to start accession negotiations for Turkey to become a full member of the European Union.
