= 2013 in the European Union =

- Decades: 1990s; 2000s; 2010s; 2020s
- See also: Other events of 2013; Timeline of EU history

Events in the year 2013 in the European Union.

2013 was designated as the European Year of Citizens.

== Incumbents ==
- (European Union) President of the European Council – (Belgium) Herman Van Rompuy
- (European Union) Commission President – (Belgium) José Manuel Barroso
- (European Union) Council Presidency – (Republic of Ireland) Ireland (Jan – Jun 2013), Lithuania (July – Dec 2013)
- (European Union) Parliament President – (Germany) Martin Schulz
- (European Union) High Representative – (United Kingdom) Catherine Ashton

== Events ==
=== January ===
- 1 January
  - Ireland takes over the six-month rotating Presidency of the Council of the European Union from Cyprus. The Presidency's three main priorities are stability, jobs and growth.

=== July ===
- 1 July
  - Croatia joins the European Union, following ratification of the 2011 Accession Treaty by all other EU countries. This seventh enlargement of the EU, brings the total number of member countries to 28, and official languages to 24.
  - Lithuania takes over the six-month rotating Presidency of the Council of the European Union from Ireland.

== European Capital of Culture ==
The European Capital of Culture is a city designated by the European Union for a period of one calendar year, during which it organises a series of cultural events with a strong European dimension.

- Marseille, France
- Košice, Slovakia

== See also ==
- History of the European Union
- Timeline of European Union history
