= European Year of Intercultural Dialogue =

Intercultural dialogue has long been a principle supported by the European Union and its institutions. The year 2008 was designated "European Year of Intercultural Dialogue" (EYID) by the European Parliament and the Member States of the European Union. It aimed to draw the attention of people in Europe to the importance of dialogue within diversity and between diverse cultures.

== Definitions ==
There is no single and universally accepted meaning of "Intercultural dialogue". Indeed, when the European Commission launched EYID by asking 27,000 EU citizens what they thought the phrase meant, by far the most common response (36%) was total puzzlement. However, a forum organised by the Council of Europe in November 2006 suggested the following:

- "an open and respectful exchange of views between individuals and groups belonging to different cultures that leads to a deeper understanding of the other's world perception".

Other definitions or usages have been closer to concepts such as inter-religious dialogue and often to active citizenship learning. In a number of countries the phrase refers to dialogue between indigenous people and immigrant peoples, and it can also be used as a metaphor for forms of contact between countries which are not based on military power.

The text adopted by the European Union on EYID does not use any specific definition, but it underlines the role of intercultural dialogue in:

- respect for cultural diversity in the complex societies of today
- the role of dialogue and greater mutual understanding in developing equal opportunities for all
- supporting the EU's commitment to solidarity and social justice
- enabling the EU to forge partnerships with other countries and make its voice better heard in the world.

== Antecedents ==
=== European years ===
EYID has a number of antecedents in the European Union's policies.

There have been a number of "European Years", beginning in 1983 with the European Year of Small and Medium-sized Enterprises and the Craft Industry. Recent and planned European Years include:

- 1983 – European Year of SMEs and the Craft Industry
- 1984 – European Year for a People's Europe
- 1985 – European Year of Music
- 1986 – European Year of Road Safety
- 1987 – European Year of the Environment
- 1988 – European Year of Cinema and Television
- 1989 – European Year of Information on Cancer
- 1990 – European Year of Tourism
- 1992 – European Year of Safety, Hygiene and Health Protection at Work
- 1993 – European Year of the Elderly and of Solidarity between Generations
- 1994 – European Year of Nutrition and Health
- 1995 – European Year of Road Safety and Young Drivers
- 1996 – European Year of Lifelong Learning
- 1997 – European Year against Racism and Xenophobia
- 1998 – European Year of Local and Regional Democracy
- 1999 – European Year of Action to Combat Violence Against Women
- 2001 – European Year of Languages
- 2003 – European Year of People with Disabilities
- 2004 – European Year of Education through Sport
- 2005 – European Year of Citizenship through Education
- 2006 – European Year of Workers' Mobility
- 2007 – European Year of Equal Opportunities for All
- 2008 – European Year of Intercultural Dialogue
- 2009 – European Year of Creativity and Innovation
- 2010 – European Year for Combating Poverty and Social Exclusion
- 2011 – European Year of Volunteering
- 2012 – European Year for Active Ageing
- 2013 – European Year of Citizens
- 2015 – European Year for Development
- 2018 – European Year of Cultural Heritage

No further European Years have yet been announced, although Commissioner Ján Figeľ, who originally proposed EYID, has reflected publicly about the possibility of designating 2009 as a European Year linking Education, Culture, and Creativity. A full list of European Years is maintained by the European Parliament . It will be seen that many of these years, particularly the more recent ones, are in the educational and social fields. In general they have been designated and run directly by the European Union and its Member States; however, some (such as 2005) have been designated and run by the Council of Europe and others (such as the 2001 European Year of Languages) were joint operations between the two bodies.

=== European Activities ===
Many of the activities of the European Union both contribute to the development of intercultural dialogue and, conversely, require it.

Activities such as the promotion of educational and training exchanges enable young people and academics/teachers/trainers to move around the European Union and require them to operate in cultures and living circumstances different from those they know best. They thus require an openness to learn from (or at least, to survive in) another culture, and they help people develop the capacities that encourage this. Similarly, the fundamental freedoms of the European Union are built on the idea that people, goods, services and capital should be able to move around the Union freely; their realisation by individuals and companies both requires and encourages intercultural dialogue.

== The purpose of the European Year of Intercultural Dialogue ==
The purpose of European Years generally has become similar to that of EYID:

- "to contribute to giving expression and a high profile to a sustained process of intercultural dialogue which will continue beyond that year" (Article 1 of the Decision establishing the Year)

European Years generally respond to a perceived need to promote an issue in the public eye; to support relevant public organisations and NGOs in their work; and to provide limited resources for some trans-national work at European level. Recent Years have concentrated more on raising the profile of the issue concerned, less on funding projects through dedicated budgets; they have rather sought to make their issue a funding priority in existing programmes (such as the Lifelong Learning programme cited above, whose Call for projects includes this priority at different points: see for example sections 1.1.3 and 4.2.4). This system avoids the need to dedicate specific budgets to the European year, or enables them to be spent on projects with higher visibility. Dedicated budgets for recent European Years have been around €12 million between the Year itself and the preceding (preparatory) year.

For this particular European Year, Commissioner Ján Figeľ has suggested three specific objectives:

- "raising the awareness of European citizens and of those living in the Union;
- developing social and personal habits that will equip us for a more open and complex cultural environment;
- finally, intercultural dialogue is linked to a more political goal: creating a sense of European citizenship".

== Actions expected ... ==
The legislation designating the year calls for the following types of activity:

- activities at European, national and regional levels promoting Intercultural Dialogue and the various objectives of the Year. These should be connected to civic education and to learning to appreciate others and their differences the legal text refers to "A limited number of emblematic actions on a European scale aimed at raising awareness, particularly among young people";
- information and promotion campaigns, particularly in connection with NGOs, and focussing on young people and children
- surveys and studies to evaluate the Year and to prepare for its long-term follow-up.

=== ... at European level ===
In response to this mandate, the European Commission held a three-month consultation (or "Call for ideas") about what the Year should entail. This was followed by a Conference and Exhibition on the European Year and on the future of Intercultural Dialogue to help identify good practice. It is now considering how these outcomes should be put into practice.

=== ... at National level ===
The legislation requires the EU Member States to nominate a national coordination body "responsible for organising that Member State's participation in the European Year of Intercultural Dialogue" (see article 4). This should have been done within one month of the adoption of the legal decision at European level (i.e., by 18 January 2007); but not all Member States have so far done so and the European Commission has not yet published the list of those bodies so far nominated.

== Ambassadors ==
The European Commission appointed fifteen "Ambassadors of the Year" in the run-up to EYID. Like "intercultural dialogue" itself, the role of these ambassadors is somewhat vague, though they are expected to be "committed to, and share, the aims of the European Year of Intercultural Dialogue (EYID) 2008" and "lend their support to making the Year a success." This vagueness has landed at least one of the ambassadors in hot water with the commission. When Marija Šerifović appeared to lend her support to the Serbian Radical Party, which favours closer cooperation with Russia rather than the EU, the Commission threatened to remove her from the unpaid ambassadorial post. A spokesman justified the threat by stating that Ms Šerifovic's "political affiliation and activities in no way express the political position of the EU in the context of the Serbian presidential elections which are a matter for the people of Serbia". The threat has not been carried out, perhaps because the Commission listened to its spokesman and decided that Serbian elections are indeed "a matter for the people of Serbia".

The fifteen international intercultural Ambassadors of the Year of Intercultural Dialogue come from all over the world (but mostly France and Belgium) and include intercultural luminaries of the calibre of Charles Aznavour, Abd al Malik, the Dardenne brothers and Marjane Satrapi. These internationally renowned figures are supported by a hundred or so nationally famous national intercultural Ambassadors of the Year of Intercultural Dialogue, who have been appointed by twenty of the twenty-seven member states according to varied and somewhat opaque criteria. Their role is, if possible, even more vague than that of the international Ambassadors of the Year.

== See also ==
- A Switch Box Tale, a 2008 multicultural music event
- Intercultural dialogue
