= 2010 European Year for Combating Poverty and Social Exclusion =

Almost 80 million people live below the poverty line in the European Union.

Problems that arise from living in poverty may include not having enough money to spend on food and clothes, poor housing conditions, homelessness, and limited lifestyle choices that may lead to social exclusion.

Inspired by its founding principle of solidarity, the European Union joined forces with its Member States to make 2010 the European Year For Combating Poverty and Social Exclusion. The objectives were to raise public awareness about these issues and renew the political commitment of the EU and its Member States to combat poverty and social exclusion. The year also challenged stereotypes and collective perceptions of poverty.

== How will it work? ==
Civil society organisations and social partners joined participating countries and the European Commission to run activities throughout 2010.

Two European-level conferences took take place in January and December; an art initiative built a bridge between people experiencing poverty and social exclusion and the creative world; while a journalist competition rewarded the best articles about poverty and social exclusion in Europe.

National and local events took place in every EU member state, plus Norway and Iceland. Activities included awareness raising campaigns, workshops and information seminars in schools. Films, magazines and other information material were produced across participating countries to help people understand how poverty and social exclusion affect their communities, what initiatives there are to fight it, and for those directly affected, to increase awareness of their rights.

Along with public figures, people who have experienced poverty acted as campaign ambassadors, which raised visibility and credibility for the Year's activities.

== Objectives of the European Year ==
- Recognition: recognise the right of persons experiencing poverty and social exclusion to live in dignity and to take an active part in society.
- Shared responsibility and participation: promote public support for social inclusion policies, emphasising collective and individual responsibility in combating poverty and social exclusion, and fostering commitment by all public and private actors.
- Cohesion: promote a more cohesive society, where no one doubts that society as a whole benefits from the eradication of poverty.
- Commitment and practical action: renew the pledge of the EU and its Member States to combat poverty and social exclusion, and involve all levels of authority in the pursuit of that aim.

== Previous European Years ==
- 2008 European Year of Intercultural Dialogue
