= 1995 in the European Union =

- Decades: 1970s; 1980s; 1990s; 2000s; 2010s
- See also: Other events of 1995; Timeline of EU history

Events in the year 1995 in the European Union.

== Incumbents ==
- (European Union) President of the European Council
  - (France) François Mitterrand (Jan – May 1995)
  - (France) Jacques Chirac (May – Jun 1995)
  - (Spain) Felipe González (July – Dec 1995)
- (European Union) Commission President
  - (France) Jacques Delors (to 24 Jan 1995)
  - (Luxembourg) Jacques Santer (from 24 Jan 1995)
- (European Union) Council Presidency
  - France (Jan – Jun 1995)
  - Spain (July – Dec 1995)

== Events ==
=== January ===
- 1 January
  - France takes over the Presidency of the Council of the European Union.
  - Austria, Finland and Sweden become members of the European Union.
- 23 January – Following the Parliament's vote of approval on 18 January, the representatives of the governments of the Member States appoint the President and Members of the European Commission for a five-year term.
- 25 January – The Commission adopts the second part of the Green Paper on the liberalisation of telecommunications infrastructure and cable television networks.

=== February ===
- 23 February – Bordessa ruling. The European Court of Justice decrees that citizens may export banknotes, coins and cheques without previous authorisation.
- 25–26 February – The G7 Ministerial Conference on Information Society is held in Brussels.

=== March ===
- 8 March – The Court of Auditors publishes a special report on the cohesion financial instrument.
- 14 March – The Council and the Parliament sign the Socrates programme in the field of education.
- 20–21 March – The Stability Pact for Central and Eastern Europe is signed and adopted in Paris.
- 26 March – The Schengen Agreement comes into force between Belgium, France, Germany, Luxembourg, the Netherlands, Portugal and Spain.

=== April ===
- 4 April – The Commission adopts a Green Paper on the role of the Union in the field of tourism.
- 9 April – Liechtenstein ratifies its accession in the European Economic Area by referendum.
- 10 April – The Council adopts a report on the functioning of the Treaty on the European Union in preparation for the 1996 Intergovernmental Conference.
- 21 April – The Committee of the Regions adopts an own-initiative opinion on preparations for the 1996 Intergovernmental Conference.
- 28 April – Austria signs the Schengen Agreement.

=== May ===
- 1 May – Liechtenstein joins the European Economic Area.
- 3 May – The Commission approves the Info 2000 programme to stimulate the development of a European multimedia content industry in the emerging information society.
- 3–10 May – The Commission adopts a White Paper on preparing the associated countries of Central and Eastern Europe for integration into the European Union internal Market.
- 11 May – The Treaty on the Non-Proliferation of Nuclear Weapons is extended for an unlimited period (joint action under common foreign and security policy).
- 31 May – The Commission adopts a Green Paper on the practical arrangements for the introduction of the single currency.

=== June ===
- 12 June – European Union Association Agreements are signed with Estonia, Latvia and Lithuania.
- 15 June – The 21st G7 summit is held in Halifax, Canada.
- 22 June – Romania applies to join the European Union. The Snagov Declaration had been signed the day earlier by the leaders of the Romanian parliamentary parties at the time to commit to Romania's accession to the EU.
- 27 June – Slovakia applies to join the European Union.
- 26–27 June – A European Council is held in Cannes, France. An overall agreement on external financing including financing arrangements for the eight European Development Fund (EDF) for Africa, Caribbean Pacific (ACP) States is reached. The transition to a single currency by 1 January 1999 is confirmed.

=== July ===
- 1 July – Spain takes over the Presidency of the Council of the European Union.
- 12 July – The European Parliament appoints Jacob Söderman, a Finn, as Ombudsman of the European Union.
- 17 July – An interim agreement with Russia, a Euro-Mediterranean agreement with Tunisia and a cooperation agreement with Vietnam are signed.
- 19 July – The Commission adopts a Green Paper on copyright and related rights in information society and on "utility models" (legal protection of intellectual property).
- 26 July – The Member States sign the Europol Convention for police cooperation.

=== September ===
- 25 September – The Member States adopt a list of non-member countries whose nationals must be in possession of a visa to enter the European Union.

=== October ===
- 13 October – Latvia formally applies to join the European Union.
- 17 October – Kalanke ruling. The European Court of Justice considers that a measure guaranteeing automatic priority to women in promotions is beyond the equality of treatment between women and men principle and is thus discriminatory based on gender.

=== November ===
- 7 November – A new Euratom-US agreement on the peaceful use of nuclear energy is signed.
- 20 November – A Cooperation Agreement is signed with Nepal. The Euro-Mediterranean Association Agreement is signed with Israel.
- 24 November – Estonia formally applies to join the European Union.
- 27–28 November – The Euro-Mediterranean Conference is held in Barcelona.
- 29 November – The Commission adopts a Green Paper on citizens' network (urban transport) and a White Paper on education and training.

=== December ===
- 8 December – Lithuania formally applies to join the European Union.
- 13 December – The Commission adopts a White Paper on energy policy for the European Union.
- 14 December – The Dayton peace agreement for Former Yugoslavia is signed in Paris. Bulgaria formally applies to join the European Union.
- 15 December – Bosman ruling. The European Court of Justice decrees that football federation rules restricting the number of foreign players in football teams and those relative to players' transfers are contrary to Community law.
- 15–16 December – A European Council is held in Madrid, Spain. It sets March 29, 1996 as the starting date for the Intergovernmental Conference and confirms the introduction of the single currency ("euro") for January 1, 1999.
- 20–21 December – The European Commission and the World Bank organise a meeting in Brussels of donor countries and organisations for the reconstruction of Bosnia-Herzegovina.

== European Capital of Culture ==
The European Capital of Culture is a city designated by the European Union for a period of one calendar year, during which it organises a series of cultural events with a strong European dimension.

- Luxembourg, Luxembourg

== See also ==
- History of the European Union
- Timeline of European Union history
