= 2010 in the European Union =

- Decades: 1990s; 2000s; 2010s; 2020s
- See also: Other events of 2010; Timeline of EU history

Events in the year 2010 in the European Union.

2010 was designated as the European Year for Combating Poverty & Social Exclusions.

== Incumbents ==
- (European Union) President of the European Council – (Belgium) Herman Van Rompuy
- (European Union) Commission President – (Portugal) José Manuel Barroso
- (European Union) Council Presidency – Spain (Jan–Jun 2010) and Belgium (Jul–Dec 2010)
- (European Union) Parliament President – (Poland) Jerzy Buzek
- (European Union) High Representative – (United Kingdom) Catherine Ashton

== Events ==
=== January ===
- 1 January
  - Spain takes over the Presidency of the Council of the European Union for the fourth time from Sweden. It is the first country to hold the presidency under the Lisbon Treaty and the new ‘trio presidency system’ that sees Spain work with the next two countries to hold the office, Belgium and Hungary.
  - The Ruhr area (Germany), Pécs (Hungary) and Istanbul (Turkey) share the title of European Capital of Culture for 2010.
- 11–19 January – European Parliament committees conduct a series of hearings with the 26 nominees for the next College of European Commissioners.
- 20 January – Mr Nikiforos Diamandouros is elected as European Ombudsman for a second time.
- 26 January – The amount offered by the EU to relief and rehabilitation efforts in Haiti rises to €400 million, after the country was hit by an earthquake reaching 7.0 on the Richter scale.

=== February ===
- 9 February – The European Parliament approves the Barroso II Commission: the result is 488 votes in favour to 137 votes against, with 72 abstentions.
- 11 February – At an informal meeting in Brussels, Heads of state and government agree to support the Greek government in its efforts to meet the Stability Programme targets for 2010. President Barroso presents his priorities for the EUROPE 2020 strategy, outlining how the EU should chart its way out of the crisis while building a new economic model.
- 25 February – The European Court of Justice rules that Israeli goods made in Jewish settlements in the occupied West Bank cannot be considered Israeli.

=== March ===
- 14–18 March – EU High Representative Catherine Ashton visits the Mid-East including Egypt, Syria, Lebanon, Jordan, Israel, and the Palestinian Territories.
- 26 March – At a European Council meeting in Brussels, EU leaders adopt Europe 2020 targets and all 16 eurozone countries back a plan to help Greece deal with its deficit.

=== April ===
- 10 April – Polish President Lech Kaczynski, his wife, and other public and military figures die in a plane crash on their way to Smolensk in Russia to commemorate 70 years since the Katyn massacre.

=== May ===
- 7 May – Heads of State and Government within the Euro area agree to deeper fiscal consolidation, stronger economic coordination and budgetary surveillance to defend the euro.

=== June ===
- 17 June – At a European Council meeting in Brussels, EU leaders adopt a 10-year strategy for smart, sustainable and inclusive growth: Europe 2020. They also decide to open accession negotiations with Iceland.
- 21 June – EU institutions reach a political agreement on the structure of the European External Action Service, and how it will function.

=== July ===
- 1 July – Belgium takes over the Presidency from Spain. Priorities, including the economy and the environment, were drawn up at an earlier date in conjunction with Spain and Hungary who share the 18-month period of rotating presidency.
- 23 July – 91 European banks undergo stress tests to assess their resilience to economic shocks. All but seven pass the tests.

=== August ===
- 18 August – The EU announces that it has provided a total of €70 million to help those affected by the recent monsoon floods in Pakistan.

=== September ===
- 29 September – The EU voices support for Europe's Roma population, speaking out against any restrictions on the free movement of EU citizens.

=== October ===
- 20 October – Mr Staffan Nilsson is elected as European Economic and Social Committee's President for a two and a half year term.
- 29 October – European Council discusses strengthening the eurozone and making economies more crisis-proof.

=== November ===
- 12 November – G20 leaders at the Seoul summit commit to a joint Action Plan to encourage more balanced growth within the global economy.
- 28 November – The EU agrees to support the Irish economy to help safeguard the stability of the euro.

=== December ===
- 11 December – The Cancún climate conference concludes with the signing of a comprehensive agreement for climate action after 2012.
- 20 December – The enhanced cooperation procedure (EU laws only applying in some EU countries initially) is used for the first time, as the European Council agrees on the rights of international couples living within the EU to choose which country's rules apply should they decide to separate.

== European Capitals of Culture ==
The European Capital of Culture is a city designated by the European Union for a period of one calendar year, during which it organises a series of cultural events with a strong European dimension.

- Essen, Germany (representing the Ruhr)
- Istanbul, Turkey
- Pécs, Hungary

== See also ==
- History of the European Union
- Timeline of European Union history
