= 1993 in the European Union =

- Decades: 1970s; 1980s; 1990s; 2000s; 2010s
- See also: Other events of 1993; Timeline of EU history

Events in the year 1993 in the European Union.

1993 was designated as:

- European Year of the Elderly and of Solidarity between Generations

== Incumbents ==
- (European Union) President of the European Council
  - (Denmark) Poul Schlüter (Jan 1993)
  - (Denmark) Poul Nyrup Rasmussen (Jan – Jun 1993)
  - (Belgium) Jean-Luc Dehaene (July – Dec 1993)
- (European Union) Commission President – (France) Jacques Delors
- (European Union) Council Presidency – Denmark (Jan – Jun 1993) and Belgium (July – Dec 1993)

== Events ==
=== January ===
- 1 January
  - Denmark takes over the Presidency of the Council of the European Union.
  - The European single market enters into force, as the European Economic Community eliminates trade barriers.
- 25 January – Social Democrat Poul Nyrup Rasmussen succeeds Conservative Poul Schlüter as Prime Minister of Denmark and President of the European Council

=== February ===
- 1 February
  - Negotiations on the accession of Austria, Finland and Sweden begin in Brussels.
  - Europe Agreement on trade signed with Romania.

=== March ===
- 8 March – Europe Agreement on trade signed with Bulgaria.

=== April ===
- 5 April – Negotiations on the accession of Norway begin in Luxembourg.

=== May ===
- 14 May – The Commission adopts a Green Paper on remedying environmental damage.
- 18 May – In a second referendum, the Danish people vote in favour of the Treaty on European Union.

=== June ===
- 14–25 June – The Community takes part in the World Conference on Human Rights held by the United Nations in Vienna, Austria
- 21–22 June – A European Council is held in Copenhagen, Denmark. The council discussed relations with the associated countries of Central and Eastern Europe, agreeing that if they so desire, they shall become full members as soon as they assume the obligations of membership by satisfying the political and economic conditions. Other areas discussed included the Institutions of the European Union, improving market access and further economic integration.

=== July ===
- 1 July – Belgium takes over the Presidency of the Council of the European Union.
- 7–9 July – The 19th G7 summit is held in Tokyo, Japan, with the European Union represented by Henning Christophersen Vice President of the European Commission and Jean-Luc Dehaene President of the European Council.
- 19 July – The Council adopts a new Tacis programme for Independent States of the former Soviet Union.

=== August ===
- 2 August – The United Kingdom ratifies the Treaty on European Union.

=== September ===
- 29 September – The Commission adopts a Green Paper on European dimension of education.

=== October ===
- 8–9 October – The Community attends the Vienna Summit organised by the Council of Europe.
- 20 October – The Commission adopts a Green Paper on guarantees for consumer goods and after-sales services.
- 25 October – An interinstitutional conference is held in Luxembourg, at the invitation of the President of the European Council, and attended by the Parliament, the Council, and the Commission. They adopted a declaration on democracy, transparency and subsidiarity. A draft agreement on the procedures for implementing the principle of subsidiarity. A draft decision of the European Parliament on the regulations and general conditions of the Ombudsman's duties, and a text of the Concillation Committee of co-decision procedure.
- 29 October – A European Council meeting of Heads of State is held in Brussels, Belgium. The council approves the procedures for the implementing of the Maastricht Treaty, confirms the aim of establishing an economic and monetary union as laid down in the Treaty, with the second phase of the EMU to begin on 1 January 1994. A common foreign and security policy was also identified as critical to tackle new challenges in Europe. Decisions regarding the location of seats of the institutions, and justice and home affairs was also made.

=== November ===
- 1 November – The European Union is formally established with the Treaty on European Union entering into force.
- 16 November – The Commission adopts a Green Paper on access of consumers to justice and the settlement of consumer disputes.
- 17 November – The Commission adopts a Green Paper on European social policy options for the Union.

=== December ===
- 5 December – The Commission adopts a White Paper on growth, competitiveness and employment: The challenges and ways forward into the 21st century.
- 6 December – The Council and the Commission reach agreement on a code of conduct governing public access to official documents.
- 9 December – A declaration is signed between the Russian Federation and the European Union by Boris Yeltsin, Jacques Delors and Jean-Luc Dehaene, aimed at strengthening relations between the two, particularly in the political sphere.
- 10–11 December – A European Council of heads of state is held in Brussels, Belgium. Meeting for the first time since the entry into force of the Treaty on European Union. It adopted an action plan regarding justice and home affairs, alongside a plan for growth, competitiveness and employment. It was decided that the European Union would convene an inaugural conference on a stability pact for countries of Central and Eastern Europe in Spring 1994.
- 13 December – The Council concludes an agreement creating the European Economic Area.
- 15 December – An agreement as part of the Uruguay Round (GATT) negotiations was signed in Geneva by the participating states on tariffs, and market access for goods and services.

== European Capitals of Culture ==
The European Capital of Culture is a city designated by the European Union for a period of one calendar year, during which it organises a series of cultural events with a strong European dimension.

- Antwerp, Belgium

== See also ==
- History of the European Union
- Timeline of European Union history
