= 2006 in the European Union =

- Decades: 1980s; 1990s; 2000s; 2010s; 2020s
- See also: Other events of 2006; Timeline of EU history

Events from the year 2006 in the European Union.

== Incumbents ==
- (European Union) President of the European Council
  - (Austria) Wolfgang Schüssel (Jan – Jun 2006)
  - (Finland) Matti Vanhanen (July – Dec 2006)
- (European Union) Commission President
  - (Portugal) José Manuel Barroso
- (European Union) Council Presidency:
  - Austria (January – June)
  - Finland (July - December)
- (European Union) Parliament President
  - (Spain) Josep Borrell
- (European Union) High Representative
  - (Spain) Javier Solana

== Events ==
- 1 January: Austria takes the Presidency.
- 20 January: Aho report on innovation published.
- 2 February:
  - The Commission launches a white paper on communication policy.
  - European Commission Vice-President Franco Frattini backs the freedom of speech of Danish newspaper Jyllands-Posten during the Jyllands-Posten Muhammad cartoons controversy.
- 16 February: The Commission's 'Bolkestein Directive' is approved at its first reading by the MEPs admit large protests outside the Parliament.
- 7 April: .eu domain opens to the public.
- 4 May: The Commission adopts a green paper on the European Transparency Initiative.
- 3 June: Montenegro declares independence, leads to separate relations and accession negotiations.
- 21 June: Barroso attends EU-US summit in Vienna.
- 1 July: Finland takes the Presidency.
- 12 July: Kroes gives Microsoft a 280.5 million euro fine for its anti-competitive behaviour.
- 24 July: The Council adopts a common position on the Bolkestein Directive
- 28 July: Polish President Lech Kaczyński calls for EU member states to reintroduce the death penalty. This angers the EU.
- 12 October: The Slovak Smer-SD was temporarily suspended from membership in The Party of European Socialists (PES) for their plans to enter into coalition with the ultranationalist Slovak National Party (SNS). This would happen again in 2023.
- 15 November: European Parliament adopts the Bolkestein Directive at its second reading.
- 12 December: Parliament approves the Bulgarian and Romanian Commissioners despite concerns over the weakness of the Multilingualism portfolio.
