= 1994 in the European Union =

- Decades: 1970s; 1980s; 1990s; 2000s; 2010s
- See also: Other events of 1994; Timeline of EU history

Events in the year 1994 in the European Union.

== Incumbents ==
- (European Union) President of the European Council – (Greece) Andreas Papandreou (Jan – Jun 1994), (Germany) Helmut Kohl (July – Dec 1994)
- (European Union) Commission President – (France) Jacques Delors
- (European Union) Council Presidency – Greece (Jan – Jun 1994), Germany (July – Dec 1994)

== Events ==
=== January ===
- 1 January
  - Greece takes over the Presidency of the Council of the European Union.
  - Stage II of economic and monetary union begins, with the establishment of the European Monetary Institute (EMI).
  - The agreement establishing the European Economic Area (EEA) enters into force.

=== February ===
- 19 February – The court of Auditors publishes the special report concerning controls of irregularities and fraud in the agricultural area.

=== March ===
- 9–10 March – The Committee of the Regions, set up by the Treaty of the European Union, holds its inaugural session. Jacques Blanc is elected chairman.
- 29 March – An informal meeting of foreign ministers is held in Ioannina. A compromise decision is adopted on rules for qualified-majority decision-making in preparation for enlargement.
- 30 March – Accession negotiations with Austria, Sweden, Finland and Norway conclude in Brussels.
- 31 March – Hungary formally applies to join the European Union.

=== April ===
- 5 April – Poland formally applies to join the European Union.
- 6 April – The Commission adopts a Green Paper on the Union's audiovisual policy.
- 15 April – The final act of the Uruguay round (GATT) negotiations is signed in Marrakesh, Morocco.
- 19 April – The Council decides on joint action under common foreign and security policy in support of the Middle East peace process.
- 26 April – The Parliament and the Council adopt the fourth framework programme on research, development and demonstration (1994–1998).

=== May ===
- 25 May – The board of governors of the European Investment Bank establishes the European Investment Fund.
- 26–27 May – An inaugural conference for a Stability Pact for central and eastern Europe is held in Paris, France.

=== June ===
- 9–12 June – Direct elections to the European Parliament are held for the fourth time.
- 12 June – A referendum is held in Austria, the majority is in favour of accession to the European Union.
- 14 June – A partnership and cooperation agreement between the European Union and Ukraine is signed in Luxembourg.
- 24–25 June – A European Council is held in Corfu, Greece. It mainly discusses growth, competitiveness and employment. The Acts of Accession of Austria, Sweden, Finland and Norway are signed. A new partnership and cooperation agreement between the European Communities, the Member States and Russia is signed.

=== July ===
- 1 July – Germany takes over the Presidency of the Council of the European Union.
- 8–10 July – The 20th Western Economic Summit is held in Naples, Italy.
- 14 July – Faccini Dori ruling. The European Court of Justice affirms that a Member State injuring a private individual by omitting to transpose a directive in its national law must pay compensation provided that certain conditions are satisfied.
- 15 July – An extraordinary meeting of the European Council is held in Brussels: Jacques Santer is chosen to succeed Jacques Delors as President of the European Commission.
- 18 July – Free trade agreements are signed in Brussels, with Estonia, Latvia and Lithuania.
- 19–26 July – The new European Parliament holds its first part-session in Strasbourg. Klaus Hänsch is elected president. Jacques Santer is formally appointed as next President of the European Commission.
- 27 July – The Commission adopts a White Paper on the European Social policy.

=== October ===
- 10 October – A cooperation agreement between the Community and South Africa is signed. A conference on Security and Cooperation in Europe (CSCE) opens in Budapest, Hungary.
- 16 October – A referendum is held in Finland, the majority is in favour of accession to the European Union.
- 25 October – The Commission adopts the first part of the Green Paper on liberalisation of telecommunications infrastructure and cable television networks.

=== November ===
- 13 November – A referendum is held in Sweden, the majority is in favour of accession to the European Union.
- 15 November – The European Monetary Institute Council meets for the first time in Frankfurt.
- 28 November – The Norwegian referendum rejects accession to the European Union.
- 29 November – The Parliament, the Council and the Commission adopt the financial perspective 1995-99 adjusted to take account of enlargement.
- 30 November – The Council adopts a first joint action in the field of Justice and Home Affairs.

=== December ===
- 6 December – The Council adopts the Leonardo da Vinci programme in vocational training and passes its first resolution under the Social Policy Protocol.
- 9–10 December – The European Council in Essen, Germany lays down lines of action for growth, competitiveness and employment with special reference to measures to combat unemployment and to bring trans-European networks into operation; it agrees on an overall strategy to bring the associated countries of Central and Eastern Europe closer to the Community and reiterates its determination to establish a Euro-Mediterranean partnership. It approves the principle of a multi-annual aid programme for Northern Ireland.
- 15–16 December – The Council adopts a conclusion on the Community strategy for reducing CO_{2} emissions and on environment and transport. It also adopts a regulation on the substances which deplete the ozone layer and a directive on the incineration of hazardous waste.
- 17 December – The European Energy Charter is signed in Lisbon.

== European Capitals of Culture ==
The European Capital of Culture is a city designated by the European Union for a period of one calendar year, during which it organises a series of cultural events with a strong European dimension.

- Lisbon, Portugal

== See also ==
- History of the European Union
- Timeline of European Union history
