= European Day of Languages =

International observance, September 26

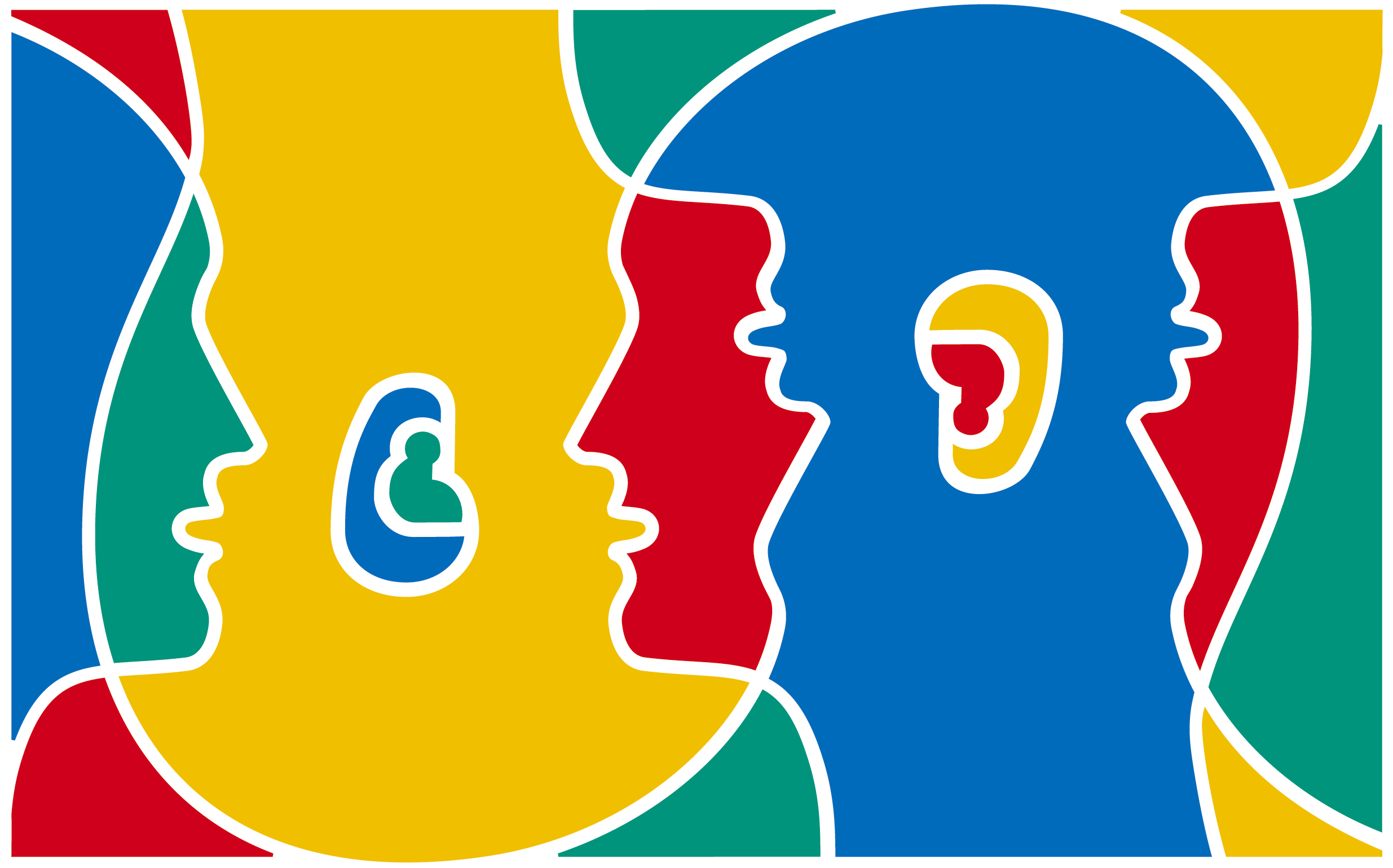
- Type: European Day / Civil holiday
- Celebrations: Day of Languages
- Date: 26 September
- Frequency: Annual

The European Day of Languages is observed on 26 September, as proclaimed by the Council of Europe on 6 December 2001, at the end of the European Year of Languages (2001), which had been jointly organised by the Council of Europe and the European Union. Its aim is to encourage language learning across Europe.

== Objectives ==
The general objectives of the European Day of Languages are to:

- Alert the public to the importance of language learning, diversity and the range of languages learned in order to increase plurilingualism and intercultural understanding
- Promote the rich linguistic and cultural diversity of Europe
- Encourage lifelong language learning in and out of school

In keeping with these rules, people, young and old, are encouraged to take up a language or to take special pride in their existing language skills. Also, those responsible for providing access to language learning are encouraged to make it easier for people to learn a range of languages, and to support policy initiatives to promote languages. There is also an emphasis on learning a language other than English.

On the occasion of the day, a range of events are organised across Europe, including those for children, television and radio programmes, language classes and conferences. The events are not organised by the Council of Europe or the European Union nor do they allocate special funding (i.e. apart from their existing language programmes) for the day. Member states and potential partners are given a free hand to organise activities. To coordinate the activities organised at the national level, the Council of Europe asks participating countries to nominate "National Relay Persons" for the day. The national relay in the UK used to be the National Centre for Languages.

== Languages of Europe ==
There are about 225 indigenous languages in Europe – roughly 3% of the world's total. Most of the European languages are of Indo-European origin. Since the end of the 18th century, the most widespread language of Europe (both in terms of geography and the number of native speakers) has been Russian, which replaced French. Counting only native speakers, approximately 150 million Europeans speak Russian on a daily basis, followed by German (approx. 95 mil.), Turkish (approx. 80 mil.), English and French (each by 65 mil.), Italian (by 60 mil.), Spanish and Polish (40 mil. each), Ukrainian (30 mil.) and Romanian (26 mil.). As far as foreign language studies are concerned, English is currently the most popular foreign language in Europe, followed by German, French, Italian, Russian and Spanish.

== Multilingualism today ==
According to the European Union survey "Europeans and their Languages" ("Special Eurobarometer 243", February 2006), 56% of EU citizens (25 member states) speak a language other than their mother tongue, while 44% admit to not knowing any languages other than their native language. Additionally, 28% know two foreign languages. Among EU citizens, 38% indicate that they know English, followed by 14% knowing French or German, 7% Russian, 5% Spanish and 3% Italian. The typical multilingual European is a student or someone holding a managerial position or someone born in a country where the language of his/her parents is different from the main language of the country.

With greater numbers of immigrants and refugees, European cities have become more multilingual. For example: in Moscow and Saint Petersburg many recent immigrants speak Ukrainian, Romanian, Armenian, Tatar, Azeri, Tajik, Chinese or one of many other languages; in London some 300 languages are spoken: apart from English, examples include French, Chinese, Polish, Russian, Spanish, Portuguese, Arabic, Bengali, Persian, Turkish, Kurdish, Berber, Hindi, Urdu, and Punjabi.

The European Union adheres to a policy of multilingualism, both in its institutional workings and as an aim for its citizens. At the 2002 EU summit in Barcelona, it set a target for children to learn at least two foreign languages from an early age. Multilingualism for the EU is linked to worker mobility and the European economy. The European Union spends more than €30 million a year promoting language learning and linguistic diversity through the Socrates and Leonardo da Vinci programmes, a policy that began with the pioneering Lingua programme in 1990.

== See also ==
- Education in the European Union
- European Charter for Regional or Minority Languages
- Languages of the European Union
- Multilingualism
- International Mother Language Day - 21 February by UNESCO as per UN Calendar of Observances
