= 2007 in the European Union =

- Decades: 1980s; 1990s; 2000s; 2010s; 2020s
- See also: Other events of 2007; Timeline of EU history

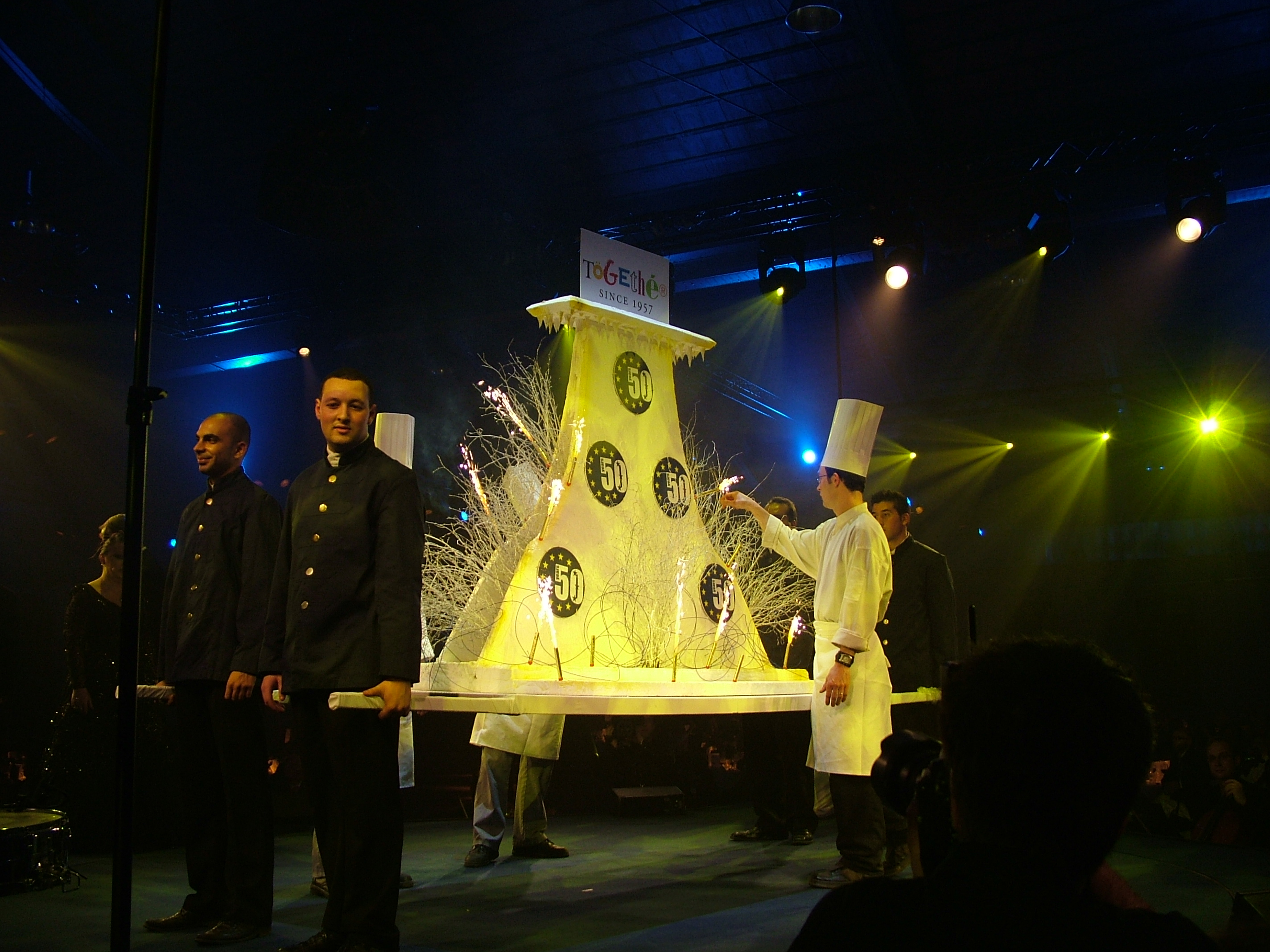
Celebration of 50 Years of European Union on 5th European Business Summit, 15-16 March 2007

Events from the year 2007 in the European Union.

== Incumbents ==
- Commission President – José Manuel Barroso, People's Party
- Council Presidency – Germany (January–June) and Portugal (July–December)
- Parliament President – Josep Borrell, Socialists (to 16 January). Hans-Gert Pöttering, People's Party
- High Representative – Javier Solana, Socialists

== Events ==
- 1 January – Bulgaria and Romania join the European Union.
- 1 January – Slovenia adopts the Euro as its official currency, replacing the tolar.
- 1 January – Irish becomes the 23rd official language of the EU.
- 1 January – Germany takes over the EU Presidency.
- 9 January – far right MEPs form a political group called Identity, Tradition and Sovereignty.
- 25 March – Berlin Declaration signed to mark the 50th anniversary of the Treaty of Rome.
- 1 June – The REACH directive, described as "most important piece of EU legislation for 20 years", comes into force.
- 23 June – EU leaders agree to a Reform Treaty (later named Treaty of Lisbon) to replace the Treaty establishing a Constitution for Europe rejected by Dutch and French voters in referendums.
- 1 July – Portugal takes over the Presidency from Germany.
- 23 July – Intergovernmental Conference on the Treaty of Lisbon starts.
- 13 December 2007 – Signing of the Treaty of Lisbon
- 21 December – Czech Republic, Estonia, Hungary, Latvia, Lithuania, Malta, Poland, Slovakia and Slovenia implement the Schengen Agreement for overland borders and seaports.

== See also ==
- History of the European Union
- Timeline of European Union history
