= Council Implementing Regulation (EU) No. 282/2011 =

European Union regulation

Council Implementing Regulation (EU) No. 282/2011 was adopted by the Council of the European Union on 15 March 2011. This was mainly because the terms and wording of Directive 2006/112/EC (hereinafter "VAT Directive") have been inconclusive in some cases. The Regulation provided new implementing measures for the VAT Directive. Especially due to the amendment of the VAT Directive itself and the consistent case-law of the European Court of Justice, the former Implementing Regulation (EC) No. 1777/2005 had to be recast and clarified in certain aspects. This Implementing Regulation became effective on 1 July 2011 and does not have to be transported into national legislation of the individual member states of the European Union (unlike a directive) and thus is directly applicable.

== Related and previous measures ==
=== Directives ===
A directive is a binding act of general application as a legal instrument of the European institutions addressed to the Member States to implement their policies, cf. Article 288 of the Treaty on the Functioning of the European Union (TFEU). To apply direct effect in national law the directive has to be transposed by the Member States.

- Council Directive 77/388/EEC of 17 May 1977

Aims at the harmonization of the laws of the Member States relating to turnover taxes and creates a common system of value added tax as a uniform basis of assessment.

- Council Directive 2006/112/EC of 28 November 2006

Aims at the harmonization of the laws of the Member States relating to turnover taxes and creates a common system of value added tax as a uniform basis of assessment. This Directive replaces Directive 77/388/EEC.

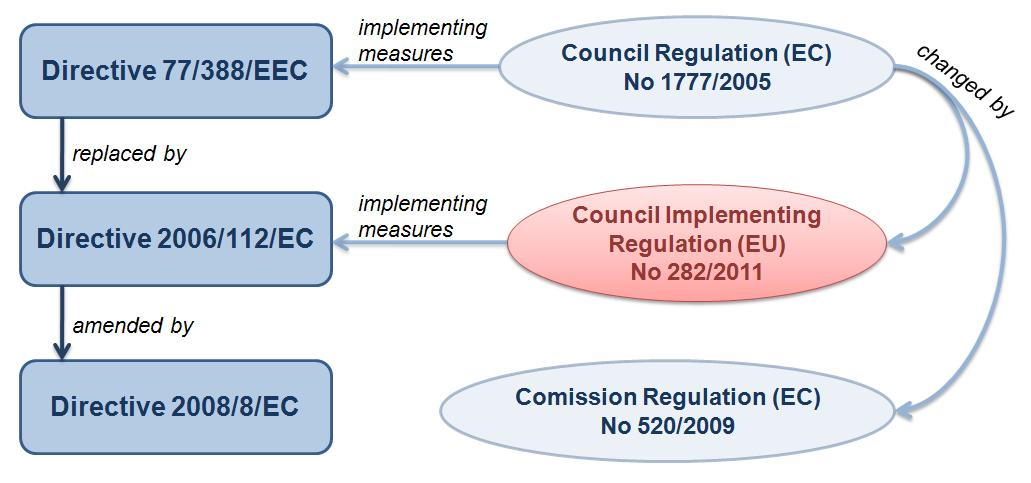
Context: Council Implementing Regulation No. 282/2011

- Council Directive 2008/8/EC of 12 February 2008

Amends Directive 2006/112/EC regarding the place of supply of services.

=== Regulations ===
Regulations are normative acts defined by Article 288 TFEU. They have general application and are directly applicable in all Member States.

- Council Regulation (EC) No. 1777/2005 of 17 October 2005

Lays down implementing measures for Directive 77/388/EEC on the common system of value added tax. Was amended by Implementing Directive (EU) No. 282/2011.

- Commission Regulation (EC) No. 520/2009 of 17 June 2009

Adopted on the issue of import licenses for applications lodged during the first seven days of June 2009 under the tariff quota opened by Regulation (EC) No. 1399/2007 for sausages and certain meat products originating in Switzerland covering changes to the place of supply and service.

- Council Implementing Regulation (EU) No. 282/2011 of 15 March 2011

Lays down implementing measures for Directive 2006/112/EC on the common system of value added tax and is a recast of Regulation (EC) No. 1777/2005.

== Legal basis ==
The statutory basis of Implementing Regulations is set out in Articles 164 and 178 of the TFEU, regarding the Implementing Regulations of the European Social Fund and the European Regional Development Funds. The validity of Implementing Regulations as legal acts depends on the "basic Regulations". The latter lay down the fundamental rules, while the implementing regulations set out the technical provisions.

== Structure ==
The structure of Regulation (EU) No. 282/2011 follows the structure of the VAT Directive and affects almost all areas:

1. Recitals (No. 1-46)

2. Chapters (Ch. I-XII)

Chapter I Subjekt matter (Art. 1)	Chapter VII Rates (Art. 43)
Chapter II Scope (Art. 2–4)	Chapter VIII Exemptions (Art. 44–51)
Chapter III Taxable persons (Art. 5)	Chapter IX Deductions (Art. 52)
Chapter IV Taxable transactions (Art. 6–9)	Chapter X Obligations of taxable persons (Art. 53–55)
Chapter V Place of taxable transactions (Art. 10–41)	Chapter XI Special schemes (Art. 56–63)
Chapter VI Taxable amount (Art. 42)	Chapter XII Final provisions (Art. 64–65)

3. Appendix (App. I-IV)

== Aim and subject ==
As mentioned in recital No. 1 of the Regulation a number of substantial changes are to be made to Council Regulation (EC) No. 1777/2005 of 17 October 2005 laying down implementing measures for Directive 77/388/EEC on the common system of value added tax. It is desirable, for reasons of clarity and rationalization, that the provisions in question should be recast. One of the main reasons for the need of amendment, referring to recital No. 3 of the Regulation, is the transpose of changes resulting from the adoption of Council Directive 2008/8/EC of 12 February 2008 amending Directive 2006/112/EC as regards the place of supply of services. Additionally the adoption of the Commission Regulation (EC) No. 520/2009 – covering changes to the place of supply and service – requires the mentioned modification. The objective is to ensure uniform application of the current VAT system by laying down rules implementing Directive 2006/112/EC, in particular in respect of taxable persons, the supply of goods and services, and the place of taxable transactions (cf. recital No. 4 Reg.).

== Scope of application ==
In accordance with Article 5 subparagraph 4 of the Treaty of European Union (TEU) this Regulation does not go beyond what is necessary in order to achieve the abovementioned objective (principle of proportionality; cf. recital No. 4 Reg.). Referring to recital No. 5 of the Regulation these implementing provisions contain specific rules in response to selective questions of application and are designed to bring uniform treatment throughout the Union to those specific circumstances only. They are therefore not conclusive for other cases and, in view of their formulation, are to be applied restrictively.

== Major subjects and most relevant changes ==
=== Definition of the scope of restaurant and catering services (Art. 6 Reg.) ===
Art. 6 of the Regulation contains that restaurant and catering services are deemed to be services consisting of the supply of prepared or unprepared food or beverages, for human consumption, accompanied by sufficient support services allowing for the immediate consumption thereof. If no such accompanying support services are provided, the supply shall not be considered a supply of services in the form of restaurant and catering services (cf. European Court of Justice C-497/09 "C-Bog", C-499/09 "CinemaxX", C-501/09 "Lohmeyer", C 502/09 "Fleischerei Nier"). Using an example that means the supply of a soda can through a drinks dispenser is not a restaurant and catering service within the meaning of Art. 6 of the Regulation.

=== Concepts of the place of business and fixed establishment (Art. 10-13 Reg.) ===
The definition of the "place where the business of a taxable person is established" deserves special attention, which is stated as the "place where the functions of the business's central administration are carried out" (cf. Art. 10 Reg.). This clarifies that the focus should not be on the day-to-day operations. To specify the place of business, account must be taken of the place where:

- essential decisions are taken on the general management of the business
- the registered office of the business is located and
- management meets.

Where these criteria do not allow the place of establishment of a business to be determined with certainty, the place where essential decisions concerning the general management of the business are taken shall take precedence (cf. Art 10 Nr. 2 Reg.). Mere presence of a postal address may not be taken to be the place of establishment of a business of a taxable person (cf. Art. 10 No. 3 Reg.).

The term "fixed establishment" is characterized in Art. 11 of the Regulation by a "sufficient degree of permanence and a suitable structure" relating to "human and technical resources to enable it to provide the service which it supplies". Thus it is not required that the branch provides services by itself. Merely it needs to have the ability to receive and use such. Even if the services are only provided for the head office the conditions are met. Nevertheless, where the resources of the fixed establishment are only used for administrative support they will not be regarded as being used for the supply of goods or services. Having a VAT number does not equal having a fixed establishment (cf. Art. 11 No. 3 Reg.).

These provisions are important for purposes of determining the place of supply of a Business-to-Business transaction pursuant to Art. 44 of the VAT Directive.

=== Concepts of status, capacity and location of the customer (Art. 17-25 Reg.) ===
The correct application of the rules based on the place of supply of services relies mainly on the status of the customer as a taxable person or non-taxable person, and on the capacity in which he is acting.

==== EU established customer ====
As mentioned in Art. 18 No. 1a of the Regulation a customer can be assumed as being a taxable person if the customer has communicated his VAT number and the supplier obtains confirmation of the validity of that identification number. The validity can be checked at the web site of the European Commission. Where the customer has not received a VAT number yet (Art. 18 No. 1b Reg.) the supplier shall obtain any other proof which demonstrates that the customer is a taxable person; and the supplier carries out a reasonable level of verification of the accuracy of the information. In accordance with Art. 18 No. 2 of the Regulation the customer is a non-taxable person if no identification number is provided.

==== Customer established outside EU ====
According to Art. 18 Nr. 3a of the Regulation the customer can be regarded as a taxable person if he provides to the supplier a certificate issued by the competent tax authorities that the customer is engaged in economic activities in order to enable him to obtain a refund of VAT. If no such document is available the customer should provide to the supplier:

- VAT number or similar number; or
- any other proof that the customer is a taxable person, and
- the supplier carries out a reasonable level of verification of the accuracy of the information provided by the customer (cf. Art. 18 Nr. 3b Reg.).

The improvement of those provisions for the suppliers is to reduce the VAT risk and strengthen the cases where the supplier acts in good faith.

==== Capacity of the customer ====
For the purpose of determining the place of supply in accordance with Art. 44 (Business-to-Business transactions) and Art. 45 (Business-to-Consumer transactions) of the VAT Directive, Art 19 of the Regulation clarifies that taxable persons or legal persons deemed to be taxable persons who receive services exclusively for private use, including by their staff, shall be regarded as non taxable persons.

=== Definition of the concept of admission to cultural events (Art. 32-33 Reg.) ===
Art. 32 and Art. 33 of the Regulation define the right of admission within the meaning of Art. 53 of the VAT Directive to cultural and similar events and services. The Regulation distinguishes between services in respect of admission to events (cf. Art. 32 Reg.) and the ancillary services (cf. Art. 33 Reg.). Art. 32 of the Regulation shall be applicable for the therein specified services except the use of facilities such as gymnastics halls and suchlike, in exchange for the payment of a fee (cf. Art. 32 No. 3 Reg.). Art. 33 of the Regulation includes services which are directly related to admission to events and includes in particular the use of sanitary facilities but shall not include mere intermediary services relating to the sale of tickets.

== Advantages and disadvantages ==
- The Regulation provides more clarity concerning special concepts of the VAT Directive, which was necessary in respect to a uniform application within the European Union.
- The Implementing Regulation is a sign for the inexactitude of the legislator when drafting the VAT Directive. The resulting inadequacies are intended to be corrected by the presented Regulation.
- Furthermore, the Implementing Regulation – being an equal regulation in comparison to the VAT Directive – will not lead to a better transparency or overview. In most cases it would have been wiser to transform the VAT Directive itself in respect to the necessary changes.
