= European Year of Equal Opportunities for All =

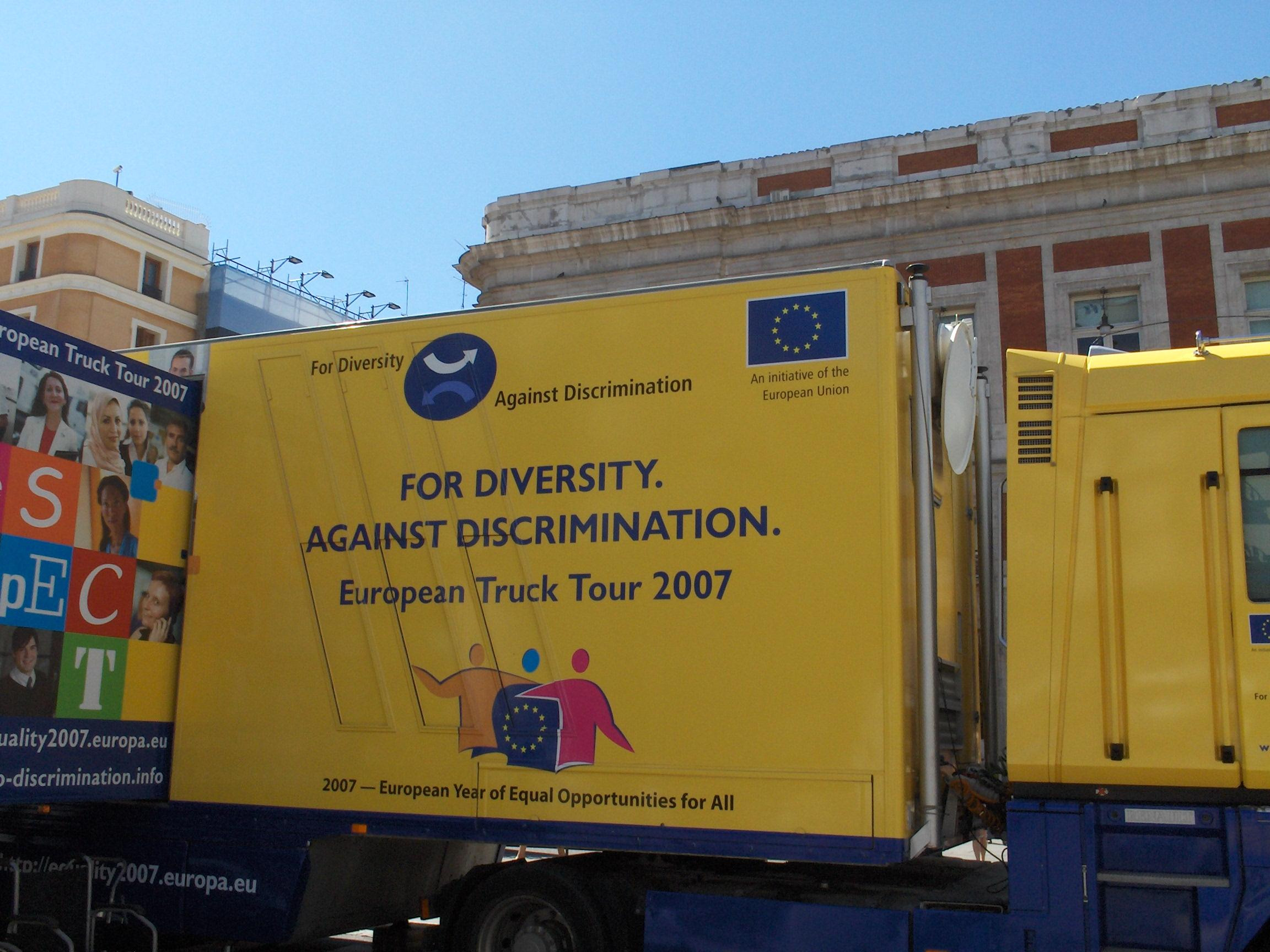
Promotional truck in Madrid.

The European Year of Equal Opportunities for All was held in 2007. This designation was made on 31 May 2005 by the European Commission's Directorate-General for Employment, Social Affairs and Equal Opportunities. It was part of a concerted effort to promote equality and non-discrimination in the European Union.

== Main working themes ==
The four core themes of the European Year proposed by the European Commission were:

- Rights – raising awareness of the right to equality and non-discrimination
- Representation – stimulating a debate on ways to increase the participation of under-represented groups in society
- Recognition – celebrating and accommodating diversity
- Respect and tolerance – promoting a more cohesive society

== Official Translations ==
- in Dutch (Nederlands): 'Europees Jaar voor Gelijke Kansen voor Iedereen' (NL)
- in German (Deutsch): 'Europäisches Jahr der Chancengleichheit' (DE)
