= European Year of Languages =

2001 was declared the European Year of Languages by the Council of Europe, the European Union, and UNESCO. In announcing the initiative, the three bodies argued for the importance of language learning for personal development and suggested that lingual competencies are needed to respond to economic, social, and cultural changes in society. The declaration was accompanied by initiatives in most European countries; it was expected to draw attention to Europe's cultural richness and to support closer collaboration among people, schools, and institutions. One initiative was a Lingual Education Week for Adults, held May 5–11 to emphasize that it is never too late to learn a new language.

== See also ==
- European Day of Languages
- Languages of the European Union
