= European Year of People with Disabilities =

The year 2003 was designated the European Year of People with Disabilities (EYPD) by the European Commission. It is sometimes called the European Year of Disabled People.

The European Commission set aside 12 million euros to recognise the European Year of People with Disabilities.

The Year was officially launched under the Greek Presidency in Athens on 26 January 2003. The opening ceremony in Athens was co-hosted by Julie Fernandez.
