= Presidents of the European Union =

Three presidents of EU institutions

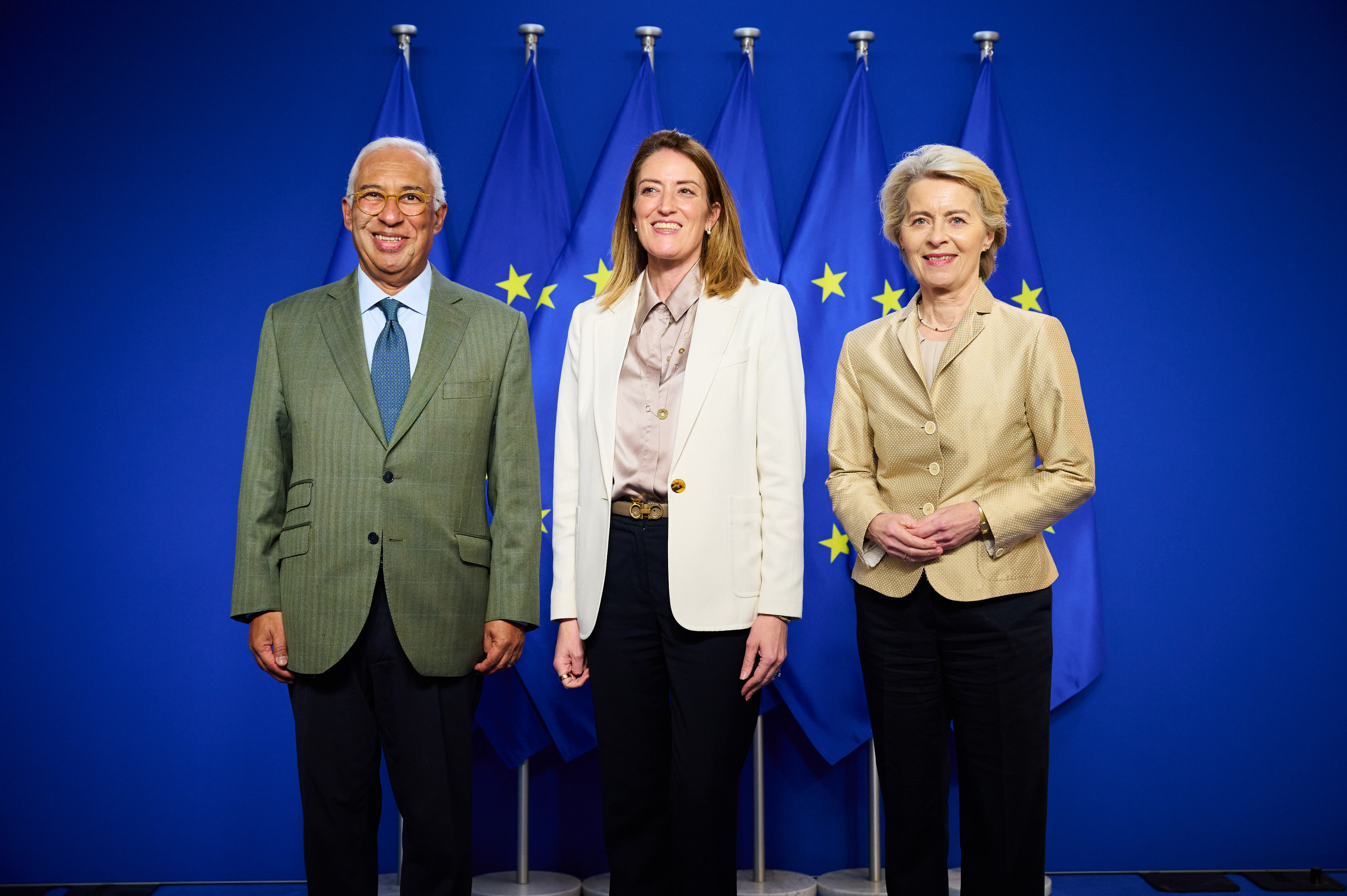
The three presidents (December 2024): of the European Council (António Costa), of the European Parliament (Roberta Metsola), and of the European Commission (Ursula von der Leyen), meeting in Brussels.

The presidents of the European Union consist of the following persons who lead three separate European Union institutions:

- the president of the European Council (since 1 December 2024, António Costa)
- the president of the European Commission (since 1 December 2019, Ursula von der Leyen)
- the president of the European Parliament (since 11 January 2022, Roberta Metsola)

Alongside these the Council of the European Union (also known as the Council of Ministers or simply "the Council") containing 27 national ministers, one of each nation, rotates its presidency by country. This presidency is held by a country, not a person; meetings are chaired by the minister from the country holding the presidency (depending on the topic, or "configuration"), except for the Foreign Affairs Council (one so-called "configuration" of the Council of the EU), which is usually chaired by the High Representative of the Union for Foreign Affairs and Security Policy. The presidency of the Council of the European Union has been held by Ireland since 1 July 2026.

According to protocol, it is the president of the Parliament who comes first, as it is listed first in the treaties. However, on the world stage, the principal representative of the EU is considered to be the president of the European Council, but the president of the European Commission, as head of the executive branch of the European Union, takes part in the G7 and other international summits as well.

== In media ==
All four offices have been described in the media as the president of Europe, but none are analogous to the head in a presidential system (who is both head of state and head of government). Comparisons with other political system have attempted to explain the complex nature of the European institutions. As each institution has its own leader, it has been suggested that the terms "Speaker" of the European Parliament, "Governor" of the European Central Bank, "President" of the Council of the European Union, "Chairman" of the European Council and "Prime Commissioner" of the European Commission would give a clearer indication of their respective roles.

During the height of the Commission president's powers in the late-1980s and 1990s, the Commission president was sometimes described in the media as "the Union's Prime Minister". Use of the term "President" in this sense is not unusual in Europe; for comparison, the title for the Prime Minister of Spain in Spanish is the Presidente del Gobierno ("President of the Government"), not Prime Minister.

== Election ==
The presidents of each institution are chosen in a slightly different way;

- The president of the European Parliament is elected from among MEPs for a 2.5-year, renewable term.
- The president of the European Council is elected by the heads of state/government of the 27 EU member states for a 2.5-year, once renewable term.
- The president of the European Commission is officially proposed by the European Council, taking into account the latest European Parliament elections and subsequently elected by the European Parliament for a 5-year, renewable term. A stronger direct link between elections and the president was attempted in the form of the spitzenkandidat process, although in 2019 the European Council rejected the Spitzenkandidat of the leading party, and instead nominated their own candidate from the same party.

== Roles ==
Organigram of the political system of the European Union, showing three presidents of the European Union

Whilst distinct, each president is required to closely co-operate with one another in a complex political system. Under the ordinary legislative procedure of the European Union, the Commission proposes legislation with the Parliament and Council of the European Union coming to a co-decision on amendments and adoption of the law. The president of each of these organs is generally held responsible their functioning and direction.

=== President of the European Council ===
The president of the European Council is considered the principal representative of the EU internationally and diplomatically. They are required to lead the council, which works to set the EU's general political direction and promote compromise and consensus within the council. They are appointed by the appropriate national leaders in the European Council.

Prior to the Treaty of Lisbon, each member state in turn took the responsibilities of both the presidency of the European Council and the presidency of the Council of the European Union, with the representative to the European Council of the respective member state currently occupying the presidency of the Council of the EU chairing meetings of the European Council. However, the title and office "President of the European Council" or any analogous position, did not exist prior to the Treaty of Lisbon. The misleading shorthand tag "EU Presidency" is still used by press today to refer to the member state holding the rotating presidency of the Council of the European Union.

=== President of the European Commission ===
The president of the European Commission leads the commission, the executive and cabinet of the European Union, and is therefore considered as the most powerful position within the EU. The president, as part of this institution, is responsible for the political direction, logistics and implementation of European law and held accountable to both the European Parliament and Council of the European Union.

The role gives the holder the right to allocate portfolios to, dismiss and reshuffle European Commissioners and direct the commission's civil service. The president is nominated by the European Council and appointed by the European Parliament. It is customary that the European Council uses the result of the last European elections to guide their nomination. The Commission president also delivers annual State of the Union address to the European Parliament.

=== President of the European Parliament ===
The president of the European Parliament ensures proper parliamentary procedure is followed and is responsible for representing the Parliament in both legal and diplomatic settings. The president must also give final assent to the EU budget.

== Gallery ==
Principal leaders of the European Union
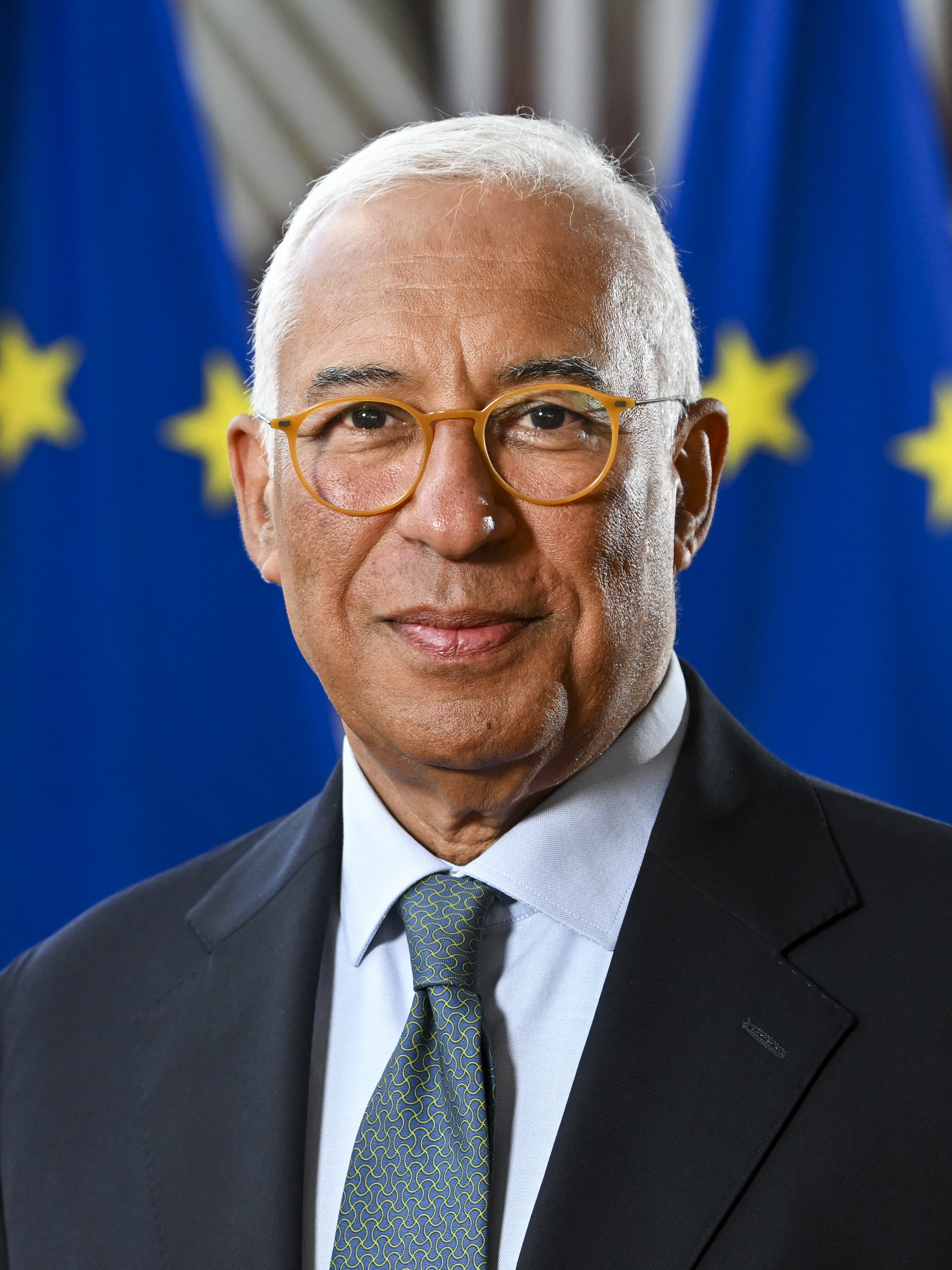
António Costa
PES–PT
President of the European Council
(since 1 December 2024)

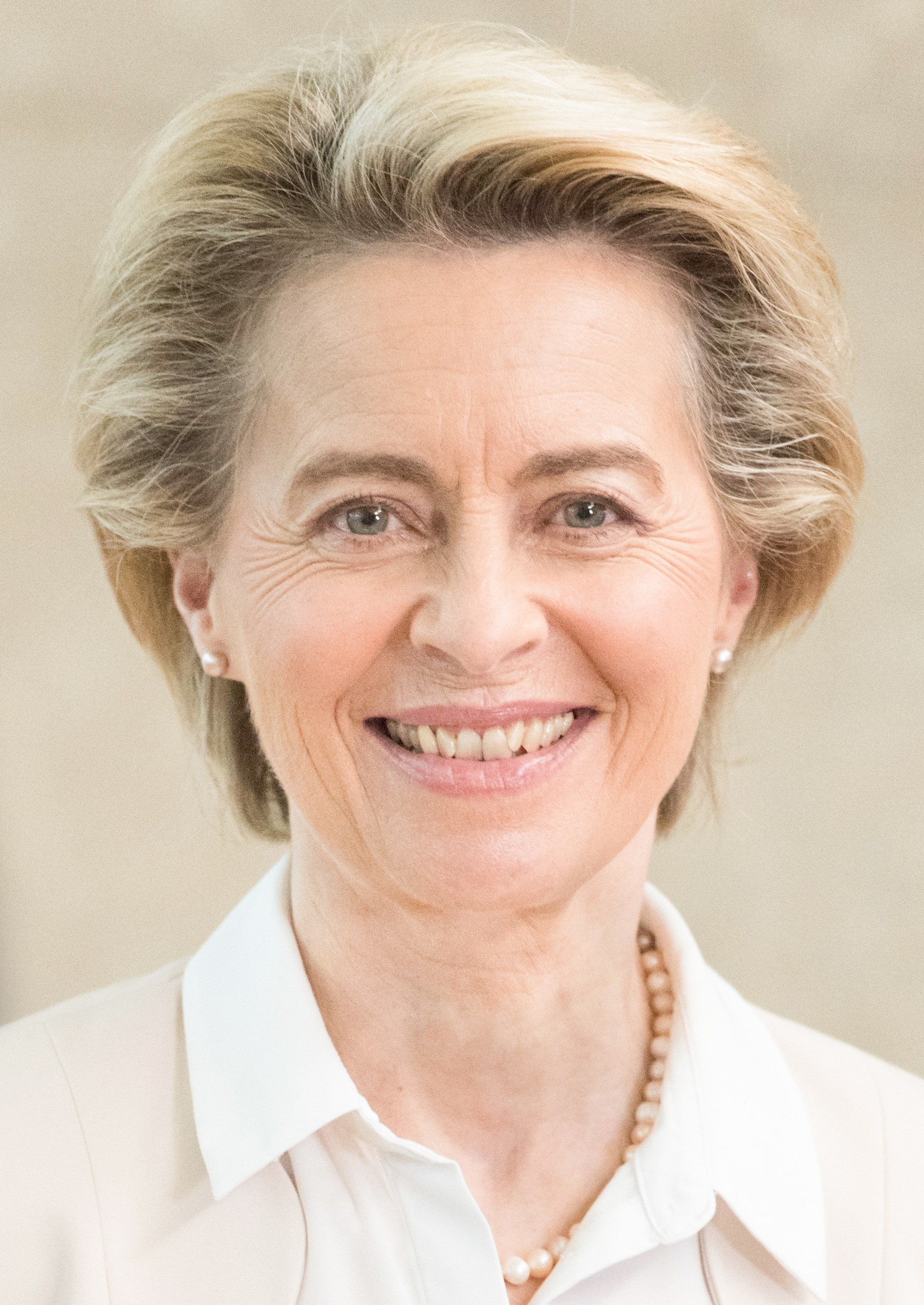
Ursula von der Leyen
EPP–DE
President of the European Commission
(since 1 December 2019)

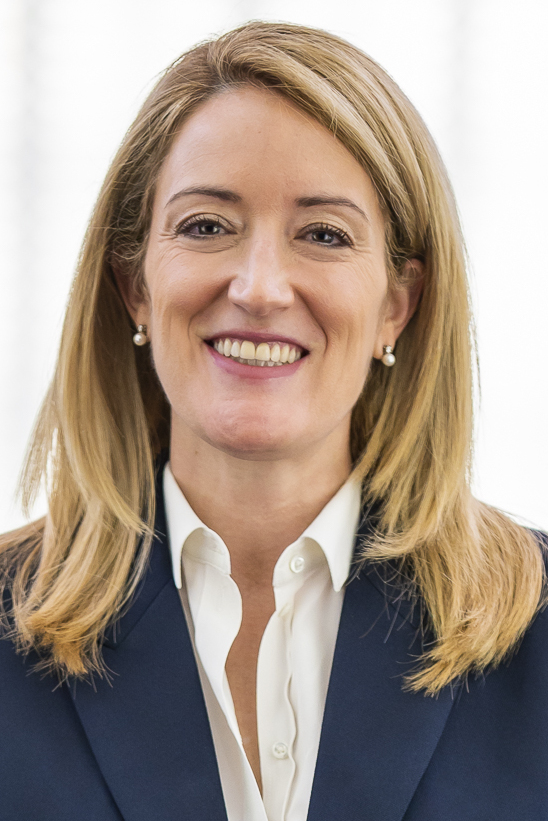
Roberta Metsola
EPP–MT
President of the European Parliament
(since 11 January 2022)

== See also ==
- List of presidents of the institutions of the European Union
- Presidency of the Council of the European Union
