= List of LGBTQ-related films of 1973 =

This is a list of lesbian, gay, bisexual, transgender or queer-related films released in 1973. It contains theatrically released films that deal with important gay, lesbian, bisexual, transgender or queer characters or issues and may have same-sex romance or relationships as a plot device.

== Films ==
Title	Director	Country	Genre	Cast	Notes
All Nudity Shall Be Punished	Arnaldo Jabor	Brazil	Drama	Paulo Porto, Darlene Glória, Elza Gomes, Paulo César Peréio, Isabel Ribeiro, Henriqueta Brieba, Sérgio Mamberti, Orazir Pereira, Abel Pera, Waldir Onofre, Teresa Mitota, Paulo Sacks and Hugo Carvana	
Baba Yaga	Corrado Farina	Italy; France	Horror	Carroll Baker, Isabelle De Funès, George Eastman	Based on the comic strip Valentina by Guido Crepax
Cleopatra Jones	Jack Starrett	United States	Blaxploitation'	Tamara Dobson, Bernie Casey, Shelley Winters	
Don Juan, or If Don Juan Were a Woman	Roger Vadim	Italy; France	Drama	Brigitte Bardot, Mathieu Carrière, Michèle Sand, Robert Walker Jr., Jane Birkin and Maurice Ronet	
The Holy Mountain	Alejandro Jodorowsky	Mexico; United States	Fantasy	Alejandro Jodorowsky	
I Will Walk Like a Crazy Horse	Fernando Arrabal	France	Drama	Emmanuelle Riva, George Shannon, Hachemi Marzouk	a.k.a. J'irai comme un cheval fou
Immoral Tales	Walerian Borowczyk	France	Drama, romance	Lise Danvers, Paloma Picasso, Charlotte Alexandra, Fabrice Luchini, Florence Bellamy, Pascale Christophe and Marie Forså	
Invasion of the Bee Girls	Denis Sanders	United States	Science Fiction	William Smith, Victoria Vetri	
Ludwig	Luchino Visconti	Italy; France; West Germany		Helmut Berger, Romy Schneider	About the life and death of King Ludwig II of Bavaria
The Nun and the Devil	Domenico Paolella (credited as Paolo Domenici)	Italy	Nunsploitation	Anne Heywood, Luc Merenda, Ornella Muti	
Some Call It Loving	James B. Harris	United States	Drama	Zalman King, Carol White, Tisa Farrow	a.k.a. Sleeping Beauty; co-written by John Collier, based on his short story of the same name
Story of a Cloistered Nun	Domenico Paolella	Italy; France; West Germany	Nunspoitation	Catherine Spaak, Eleonora Giorgi, Suzy Kendall	
Summer Wishes, Winter Dreams	Gilbert Cates	United States	Drama	Joanne Woodward, Martin Balsam, Sylvia Sidney	
Thriller – A Cruel Picture	Bo Arne Vibenius	Sweden	Crime, drama, thriller	Christina Lindberg, Heinz Hopf, Despina Tomazani, Per-Axel Arosenius, Solveig Andersson, Björn Kristiansson, Marie-Louise Mannervall, Hildur Lindberg, Marshall McDonagh, Pamela Pethö-Galantai, Hans-Eric Stenborg, Stig Ström, Gunnel Wadner and Bo Arne Vibenius	
The Tenderness of Wolves	Ulli Lommel	West Germany	Crime, horror, thriller	Kurt Raab, Jeff Roden, Margit Carstensen, Ingrid Caven, Wolfgang Schenck, Brigitte Mira, Rainer Hauer, Barbara Bertram, Rainer Werner Fassbinder, Heinrich Giskes, Friedrich-Karl Praetorius, Karl von Liebezeit, Walter Kaltheuner, El Hedi ben Salem and Rainer Will	aka Die Zärtlichkeit der Wölfe
