= Panic Movement =

French artist collective

- Mouvement panique
- Formation: February 1962
- Founder: Fernando Arrabal; Alejandro Jodorowsky; Olivier O. Olivier; Jacques Sternberg; Christian Zeimert; Abel Ogier; Roland Topor
- Dissolved: 1973
- Headquarters: Paris, France

Panic Movement (French: Mouvement panique) was an art collective formed by Fernando Arrabal, Alejandro Jodorowsky, and Roland Topor in Paris in 1962. Inspired by and named after the god Pan, and influenced by Luis Buñuel and Antonin Artaud's Theatre of Cruelty, the group concentrated on chaotic and surreal performance art, as a response to surrealism becoming mainstream.

The movement's violent theatrical events were designed to be shocking, and to release destructive energies in search of peace and beauty. One four-hour performance known as Sacramental Melodrama was staged in May 1965 at the Paris Festival of Free Expression. The "happening" starred Jodorowsky dressed in motorcyclist leather and featured him slitting the throats of two geese, taping two snakes to his chest and having himself stripped and whipped. Other scenes included "naked women covered in honey, a crucified chicken, the staged murder of a rabbi, a giant vagina, the throwing of live turtles into the audience, and canned apricots."

Arrabal and Jodorowsky later started to work also on film. Arrabal is well known for his films Viva la muerte (1971) and I Will Walk Like a Crazy Horse (1973), while Jodorowsky achieved even more fame with Fando y Lis (1967), El Topo (1970) and The Holy Mountain (1973). Jodorowsky dissolved the Panic Movement in 1973, after the release of Arrabal's book Le panique.

== See also ==
- Christian Zeimert
- Viennese Actionism
- Angura

== Bibliography ==
- Arrabal, Fernando (1973). Le Panique. Paris: Union générale d'éditions (10/18).
- Arrabal, Fernando, Jodorowsky, Alejandro, Topor, Roland (1978). Panico. Italy: Pellicanolibri
- Arrabal, Fernando (2006). Panique Manifeste pour le troisième millénaire. Paris: Ed. Punctum.
- Aranzueque-Arrieta, Frédéric (2008). Panique: Arrabal, Jodorowsky, Topor [essay]. L'Harmattan.
