= Fernando Arrabal =

Spanish writer and actor (born 1932)

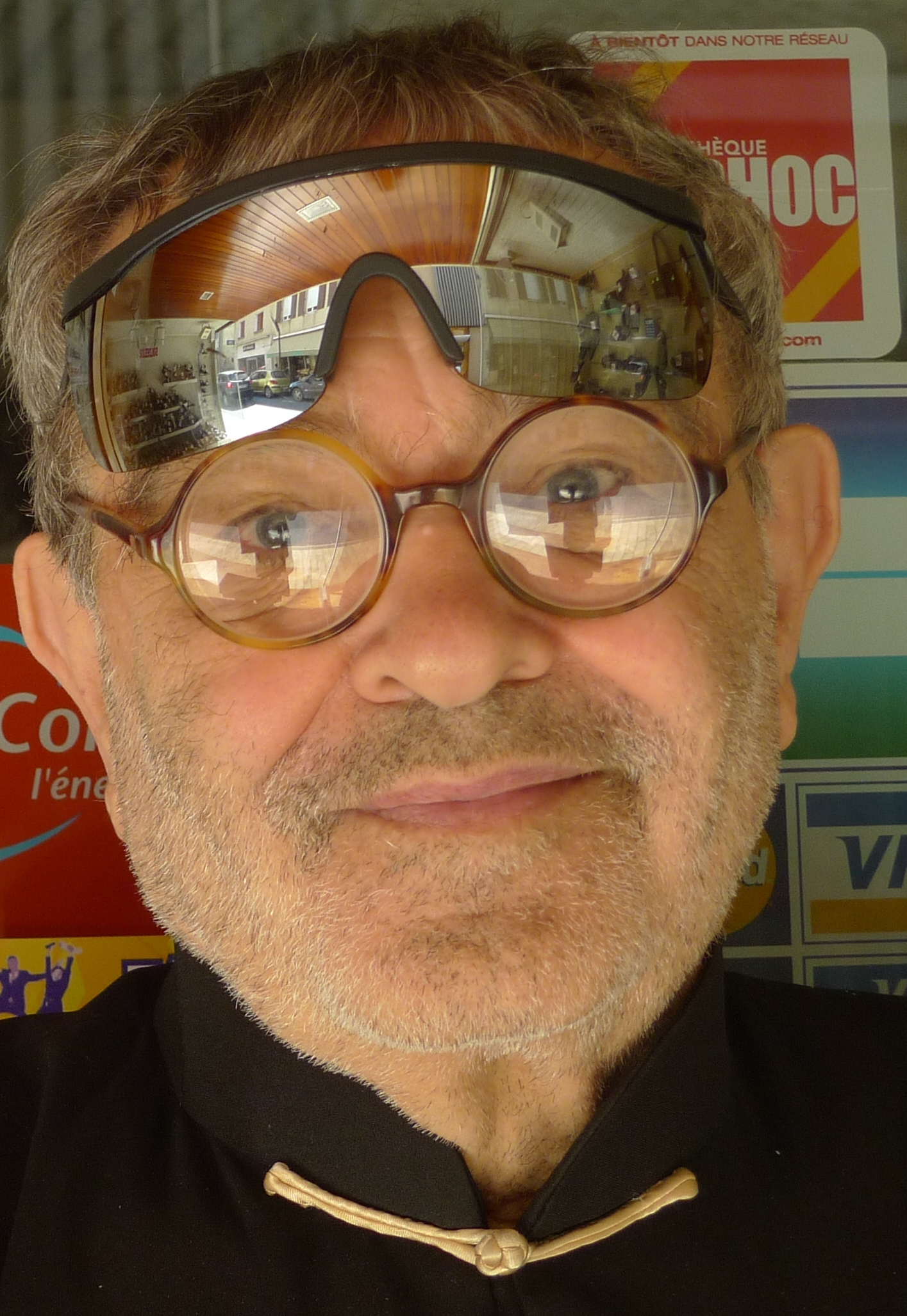
- Arrabal in 2012
- Born: Fernando Arrabal Terán; August 11, 1932 (age 94); Melilla, Spain
- Occupations: Playwright, screenwriter, film director, novelist and poet
- Writing career
- Period: 1950s–present

Fernando Arrabal Terán (/ærəˈbæl/; Spanish: [araˈβal]; born August 11, 1932) is a Spanish playwright, screenwriter, film director, novelist, and poet. He was born in Melilla and settled in France in 1955. Regarding his nationality, Arrabal describes himself as "desterrado", or "half-expatriate, half-exiled".

Arrabal has directed seven full-length feature films and has published over 100 plays; 14 novels; 800 poetry collections, chapbooks, and artists' books; several essays; and his notorious "Letter to General Franco" during the dictator's lifetime. His complete plays have been published, in multiple languages, in a two-volume edition totaling over two thousand pages. The New York Times' theatre critic Mel Gussow has called Arrabal the last survivor among the "three avatars of modernism".

In 1962, Arrabal co-founded the Panic Movement with Alejandro Jodorowsky and Roland Topor, inspired by the god Pan. He was elected Transcendent Satrap of the Collège de Pataphysique in 1990. Forty other Transcendent Satraps have been elected over the past half-century, including Marcel Duchamp, Eugène Ionesco, Man Ray, Boris Vian, Dario Fo, Umberto Eco, and Jean Baudrillard. Arrabal spent three years as a member of André Breton's surrealist group and was a friend of Andy Warhol and Tristan Tzara.

Writer and critic Javier Villan wrote of Arrabal:

Arrabal's theatre is a wild, brutal, cacophonous, and joyously provocative world. It is a dramatic carnival in which the carcass of our 'advanced' civilizations is barbecued over the spits of a permanent revolution. He is the artistic heir of Kafka's lucidity and Jarry's humor; in his violence, Arrabal is related to Sade and Artaud. Yet he is doubtless the only writer to have pushed derision as far as he did. Deeply political and merrily playful, both revolutionary and bohemian, his work is the syndrome of our century of barbed wire and Gulags, a manner of finding a reprieve.

== Childhood (1932–1946) ==
Arrabal (Terán is his second family name) was born to Carmen Terán González and painter Fernando Arrabal Ruiz.

On July 17, 1936, when insurrections within the military were staged against the constitutional government of the Second Spanish Republic, launching the Spanish Civil War, Arrabal's father remained faithful to the Republic and was sentenced to death for mutiny. His sentence was later commuted to 30 years' imprisonment. He was transferred between prisons, from Santi Espiritu in Melilla to Monte Hacho in Ceuta, where he attempted suicide, as well as Ciudad Rodrigo and Burgos. On December 4, 1941, he was sent to the Burgos Hospital due to apparent mental disorder. Later research has found that he likely feigned mental order in order to be transferred to a lower security prison. On December 29, 1941, he escaped from the hospital in his pajamas, despite three feet of snow covering the countryside. Despite extensive research, he was never seen again.

About his father, Arrabal has written: "Without trying to compare what is incomparable, when I confront these twilight episodes (and quite often without any logical connection), I often think of that scapegoat, my father. The day on which the Uncivil War began, he was locked up by his 'compassionate companions' in the flag room of the Melilla military barracks. He was meant to think carefully, since he risked a death sentence for mutiny if he did not join them in their insurrection (alzamiento). After an hour, Lieutenant Fernando Arrabal summoned his ex-comrades – already! – to inform them that he had pondered long enough. Today, because of this precedent, must I serve as witness, example, or symbol, as he did, of the most fundamental occurrences? I, who am a mere exile. If I am taken away from my beloved numerics, everything around me leads to over-the-counter confusion and disorder. I have no wish to be a scapegoat like my father, I only ask to die while still living, whenever Pan so wishes."

In 1936, Arrabal's mother returned to Ciudad Rodrigo with her young son, Fernando, and found a job at Burgos, then-capitol of the Nationalists and headquarters of General Franco's government. Fernando was enrolled in a local Catholic school from 1937 until 1940, when the Civil War ended and he moved with his mother to Madrid.

Arrabal was awarded the national prize for gifted children in 1941. He continued his studies at Las Escuelas Pías de San Antón, a church school whose alumni have also included Victor Hugo and Jacinto Benavente y Martínez. Arrabal later studied at another distinguished Madrid school, Colegio Padres Escolapios De Getafe. He was an avid reader and was eager to experience life.

== Youth and young adulthood (1947–1976) ==
In 1947, when his mother ordered him to attend preparatory classes for entrance to the Academia General Militar, Arrabal protested by playing hooky. She subsequently sent him to Tolosa (Gipuzkoa), where he studied business at the Escuela Teórico-Práctica de la Industria y el Comercio del Paper, in 1949. By 1950, he had begun writing several plays, which remain unpublished.

In 1951, Arrabal began working in the paper industry at La Papelera Española. He moved to Valencia and passed his bachillerato, the first non-compulsory educational option in Spain for admission to university. He later moved to Madrid and began legal studies. During these years, he frequented the cultural institution Ateneo de Madrid and heard poets from the Postismo school. He was also finishing his early play Picnic, then titled The Soldiers, and writing El triciclo, at first titled Men with a Tricycle.

In 1954, Arrabal hitchhiked to Paris to attend a performance of Bertolt Brecht's Mother Courage and Her Children given by the touring Berliner Ensemble. Later that year, in Madrid, he met Luce Moreau, who became his wife. In 1955, he was awarded a three-month scholarship to study in Paris, during which time he lived at the Colegio de España at the Cité Universitaire. While in Paris he suffered a serious relapse of tuberculosis. He considered this disease to be a "lucky mishap" that allowed him to move permanently to his "veritable homeland, that of Kundera and Vives, Saint Ignatius of Loyola and Picasso: exile." In 1976 he appeared in Rosa von Praunheim's New York film Underground and Friends.

== Politics ==
Arrabal had been known for being anti-Francoist and anti-monarchist and interested in anarchist trends in cultural production. Arrabal had a complicated relationship with Communism. He had ties with the Communist Party of Spain during his exile, but a rupture seems to have occurred in 1977 due to a conflict with his play The Architect and the Emperor of Assyria being performed in Barcelona with artists reputed to have Communist Party ties.

== Awards and recognition ==
Arrabal was among the more controversial writers of his time, and his work has been recognized internationally. Awards include the Grand Prize for Theatre of the Académie Française, the Premio Mariano de Cavia for journalism, the Nabokov Prize for novels, the Espasa Prize for essays, and the World Theater Prize.

In 2001, he was nominated for the Premio Cervantes by Nobel Prize in Literature winner Camilo José Cela and José Hierro. He was reportedly a finalist for the Nobel Prize in 2005 due to the solicitation of several institutions and individuals. On July 14, 2005, he was named to France's Légion d'honneur. In 2007, he was awarded a doctorate of letters Honoris Causa by the Aristotle University of Thessaloniki in Greece.

His other awards and recognition include:

- 2025: Order of Isabella the Catholic, June 18th, 2025
- 2019: Grand Cross of the Civil Order of Alfonso X, the Wise, March 1, 2019
- 2010: Premier Prix International Théâtre du Millénaire
- 2008:
  - Hijo adoptivo de Ciudad Rodrigo (Spain)
  - Ciudadano de honor, Erlanger (Germany)
  - Fronteira do Pensamento with Bob Wilson, Wim Wenders, Philip Glass, and Bernard Henri Levy (Porto Alegre, Brazil)
- 2007:
  - Prix Spinoza (Festival Teranova)
  - Doctorate of letters Honoris Causa (Thessaloniki, Greece)
  - Max de Honor, Teatro (Spain)
  - Prix Pasolini, cinéma (París)
- 2006:
  - Gran Prix d'Interprétation (Festival de Quend, film: Avida)
  - Citoyen d'honneur de Spa (Belgium)
  - Clés de la ville de Fontenay (France)
- 2005:
  - French Legion of Honor, July 14, 2005
  - Checa Association of Film Directors Prize, René Char Gold Medal, Avignon Festival
- 2004
  - First Panic Award, International Book Fair (Brussels)
  - Francisco de Vitoria Prize (Puerto Rico)
  - Wittgenstein Prize (University of Murcia, Spain)
- 2003
  - National Dramatic Literature Award (Spain)
  - Gold Medal of San Fando (Buenos Aires)
- 2002: Gold Medal of the City of Avignon
- 2001: Premio Nacional de Teatro (Spain)
- 2000: National Prize for Literature (Spain)
- 1999: Alessandro Manzoni Poetry Prize (Italy)
- 1998: Prize of the Society of Authors (France)
- 1995: Officer of Arts and Letters (France)
- 1993: Theatre Prize of the Académie française
- 1990: elected to honorary title of Transcendent Satrape of the Collège de 'Pataphysique; group founded in 1948 in homage to French author Alfred Jarry, has named previous Transcendent Satrapes including: Camilo José Cela, René Clair, Jean Dubuffet, Marcel Duchamp, Max Ernst, M. C. Escher, Eugène Ionesco, Michel Leiris, Man Ray, The Marx Brothers, Joan Miró, Jacques Prévert, Raymond Queneau, and Boris Vian; after Arrabal received this title, other Transcendent Satrapes have been named, including: Roland Topor, Umberto Eco, and Dario Fo
- 1986: Fine Arts Gold Medal of the Ministry of Culture (Spain)
- 1983: Chevalier of Arts and Letters (France)
- 1982: Nadal Prize for La torre herida por el rayo
- 1976: Obie Award for Theater (New York)
- 1965 Lugné-Poë Theatre Prize (France)
- 1959: Ford Foundation Award with Italo Calvino, Hugo Claus, Charles Tomlinson, Günter Grass, and Robert Pinget (New York)

== Selected works ==
=== Feature-length films ===
Arrabal has written and directed seven feature-length films, and has been awarded the Premio Pier Paolo Pasolini for his contributions to cinema.

- 1971: Viva la muerte; co-produced by Isabel-Films (Paris) and S.A.T.P.E.C. (Tunis); starring Nuria Espert, Ivan Henriques, and Anouk Ferjac
- 1973: J'irai comme un cheval fou; produced by Société Générale de Production – Babylone Films; starring Emmanuelle Riva, Hachemi Marzouk, and George Shannon
- 1975: L'arbre de Guernica; produced by C.V.C. Communication, Federico Mueller, and Harry N. Blum; starring Mariangela Melato and Ron Faber
- 1982: The Emperor of Peru (also released as Odyssey of the Pacific and Treasure Train); produced by Babylone Films; starring Mickey Rooney and Monique Leclerc
- 1983: Le cimetière des voitures; television film; co-produced by Antenne 2 and Babylone Films; starring Alain Bashung and Juliette Berto
- 1992: Adieu, Babylone!; produced by Antenne 2 – Cinecim; starring Lélia Fischer and Spike Lee
- 1998: Jorge Luis Borges: Una vida de poesía; produced by Alphaville – Spirali (Italy); starring Lélia Fischer and Alessandro Atti

In 2005, a 3-disc box set of Arrabal's films was released by Cult Epics with Viva la muerte, I Will Walk Like a Crazy Horse, and The Tree of Guernica.

Several of Arrabal's plays have been adapted for film, including Le grand cérémonial, directed by Pierre-Alain Jolivet; El triciclo, directed by Luis Argueta; El ladrón de sueños, directed by Arroyo; Pique-nique, directed by Louis Sénéchal; Guernica, directed by Peter Lilienthal; and Fando y Lis, directed by Alejandro Jodorowsky.

One critic wrote, "Viva la muerte is an absolute masterpiece, one of the most astonishing I have seen in my lifetime" (André Pieyre de Mandiargues). Another, for Rolling Stone, wrote, "Arrabal is ferociously original" (John Parrack). Amos Vogel wrote, in the Village Voice, "An audacious, paroxistic, and artistically successful work". Raymond Léopold Bruckberger wrote, for Le Monde, "I prefer Arrabal to Fellini or Ingmar Bergman... he is to cinema what Rimbaud is to poetry."

=== Short films ===
- 1978: Sang et or; produced by Antenne 2; starring Edgar Rock and Joshua Watsky
- 1990: Échecs et Mythe; produced by Antenne 2; starring Joël Lautier, Roland Topor, Julie Delpy, and Gabriel Matzneff
- 1991: New York City!; produced by Antenne 2; starring Tom O'Horgan, Melvin Van Peebles, and Tom Bishop

=== Operas ===
Arrabal's opera Faustbal with music by Leonardo Balada premiered at the Teatro Real de Madrid on February 13, 2009, staged by the Comediants of Barcelona. Arrabal wrote of the opera, "Faustbal is a woman who, in the third millennium, is the reincarnation of Alfred Jarry's Doctor Faustroll, a new doctor Faust who asks God and Lucifer for words and prayers so that love and charity might be unified. Nothing can satisfy the hurricane of her scientific curiosity, nor calm the storms of her desires. A genius, very beautiful, and enriched by her transports and transfigurations, she vows a torrid love for her Amazon. She leaps between galaxies while the war to end all civilization rages, and moves through space at supersonic speed. Confronting her, Margarito, supreme leader of the armed forces, dons the armor of brutal, electronic repression. He is madly in love with Faustbal under the sky's cupola. He tries to possess her through the torrent of his tower, employing the services of Mephistopheles himself. Jesús López Cobos, music director of the Teatro Real de Madrid, will conduct the world premiere, which will be sung by sopranos Ana Ibarra and María Rodríguez. The mezzo-soprano Cecilia Diaz will sing the role of the Amazon, while tenors Gerhard Siegel and Eduardo Santamaría will be the two Margaritos, bass Stefano Palatchi will perform the role of God, and baritones Tomas Tomasson and Lauri Vasar will be Mephistopheles."

Four other operas with Arrabal's librettos have been staged, and the author describes them as "always having been as complex, yet suffering from as few complexes, as did Faustbal." They are:

- Apokaliptica, music by Milko Kelemen.
- L'opéra de la Bastille, music by Marcel Landowski
- Picknick im Felde, music by Constantinos Stylianou
- Guernica, music by Ostfiend Busing

In October 1985, Arrabal made his debut as an opera stage director at the Opéra Royal de Belgique, where he directed Manuel de Falla's La vida breve and Enrique Granados' Goyescas. "Of course," Arrabal commented, "under my direction the onstage chorus was nude, or to be more precise, panically covered with clay."

In 1994, Chamber Made produced the opera of Arrabal's The Two Executioners, with libretto by Douglas Horton and music by David Chesworth. The opera ran for two seasons in Melbourne, 1994 and 1996 at the Malthouse Theatre. Australia's The Independent Monthly wrote, "Easily the most impressive and memorable piece of music theatre in 1994."

=== Novels ===
- Baal Babylone, 1959 (New York: Grove Press, 1960; Berlin: Luchterhand Literaturverlag, 1960; Milan: Lerici, 1960; Amsterdam: De Bezige Bij, 1972)
- L'enterrement de la sardine (Julliard, 1961; The Burial of the Sardine, London: Calder and Boyars, 1966; El entierro de la sardina, Barcelona: Destino, 1984)
- Fêtes et rites de la confusion (Madrid, Barcelona: Alfaguara, 1966; Riten und Feste der Konfusion, Stuttgart: Joseph Melzer, 1969)
- La Tour prends garde (Paris: Grasset, 1983; La torre herida por el rayo, Barcelona: Destino, 1983; Destino libro, 1984; Círculo de Lectores, 1984; A Torre ferida pelo Raio, Lisboa: Inquirito, 1982; Hohe Türme trifft der Blitz, Colonia: Kiepenheuer & Witsch, 1986; The Tower Struck by Lightning, New York: Viking, 1988)
- La Reverdie (Paris: Christian Bourgois, 1985)
- La piedra iluminada (Barcelona: Destino, 1985; The Compass Stone, tr. Andrew Hurley, New York: Grove Press, 1987)
- La vierge rouge (Paris: Acropole, 1986; La virgen roja, Barcelona: Seix Barral, 1987; A Virgen Vermelha, Lisboa: Dom Quixote, 1987; A Virgen Vermelha, Botafogo: Nova Frontera, 1988; Die rote Jungfrau, Göttingen: Steidl, 1990; The Red Virgin, New York, London: Penguin Books, 1993)
- La fille de King-Kong (Paris: Acropole, 1988; La hija de King Kong, Barcelona: Seix Barral, 1988)
- L' extravagante croisade d'un castrat amoureux (Paris: Ramsay, 1989; La extravagante cruzada de un castrado enamorado, Barcelona: Seix Barral, 1990)
- La tueuse du jardin d'hiver (Paris: Écriture, 1994)
- Le funambule de Dieu (Paris: Écriture, 1998)
- Porté disparu (Paris: Plon, 2000)
- Champagne pour tous (Paris: Stock, 2002)
- Como un paraíso de locos (2008)

=== Artists' books ===
Arrabal has made over 700 artists' books in collaboration with Salvador Dalí, René Magritte, Roland Topor, Julius Baltazar, Antonio Saura, Olivier O. Olivier, Maxime Godard, Jean Cortot, Jorge Camacho, Ralph Gibson, Enrico Baj, Gustavo Charif, Milan Kundera, Michel Houellebecq and others. They include:

- L'odeur de Sainteté (Paris: Yves Rivière, 1975; with Antonio Saura; 2 copies)
- Cinq sonnets, cincq eaux-fortes (Paris: André Biren, 1980; with Balthazar; 80 copies)
- Sous le flux libertin (Paris: Robert et Lydie Dutrou, 1991; with Jean Cortot)
- Triptyque (Cuenca: Menú, 2004; with Catherine Millet and Michel Houellebecq; 36 copies)
- Clitoris (2008 poem with 56 translations, including Czech by Milan Kundera)

=== Poetry ===
- La pierre de la folie (Paris: Julliard, 1963)
- Cent sonnets (Saragossa: El Ultimo Parnaso, 1965)
- Humbles paradis (Paris: Christian Bourgois, 1985)
- Liberté couleur de femme ou Adieu Babylone, Poèmes cinématographiques (Mortemart: Rougerie, 1993)
  - Arrabalesques – Lettres à Julius Baltazar (Mortemart: Rougerie)
- Diez poemas pánicos y un cuento (Córdoba: Caja Sur y Rute, 1997)

In 2015, some of Arrabal's poems were adapted with music by the band Seagoat Bones on their etude album Phonèmes.

=== Plays ===
Arrabal has published over 100 plays in 19 volumes. His plays include, with translations noted:

- 1952
  - Le toit (unpublished)
  - Le char de foin (unpublished)
  - La blessure incurable (unpublished)
- 1958
  - Oraison (Paris: Julliard) (Plays, Vol. 1: Orison, etc. translated by Barbara Wright, London: Calder and Boyars, 1962; Orazione, etc., Milan: Lerici, 1962)
  - Les deux bourreaux (Paris: Julliard) (The two executioners translated by Richard Howard, New York: Grove Press, 1960; Plays, Vol. 1: The Two Executioners, etc., translated by Barbara Wright, London: Calder and Boyars, 1962; I due Carnefici, etc., Milan: Lerici, 1962)
  - Fando et Lis (Paris: Julliard) (Plays, Vol. 1: Fando and Lis, etc. translated by Barbara Wright, London: Calder and Boyars, 1962)
  - Le cimetière des voitures (Paris: Julliard) (The Automobile Graveyard translated by Richard Howard, New York: Grove Press, 1960; Plays, Vol. 1: The Car Cemetery, etc. translated by Barbara Wright, London: Calder and Boyars, 1962; Automobil Kirkegaarden, Copenhagen: Arena, 1964)
- 1961
  - Guernica (Paris: Julliard) (Plays, Vol. 2: Guernica, etc. translated by Barbara Wright, London, Calder and Boyars: 1967)
  - Le labyrinthe (Paris: Julliard) (Plays, Vol. 2: The Labyrinth, etc. translated by Barbara Wright, London, Calder and Boyars: 1967)
  - Le tricycle (Paris: Julliard) (Plays, Vol. 2: The Tricycle, etc. translated by Barbara Wright, London: Calder and Boyars, 1967; The Tricycle translated by David Herzberger, Modern International Drama 9.2, 1976, p. 65-91)
  - Pique-nique en campagne (Paris: Julliard). (Picnic on the Battlefield translated by James Hewitt, Evergreen Review 4.15, 1960, p. 76-90; Pic-nic, etc., Milan: Lerici, 1962; Plays, Vol. 2: Picnic on the Battlefield, etc., translated by Barbara Wright, London: Calder and Boyars, 1967)
  - La bicyclette du condamné (Paris: Julliard) (Plays, Vol. 2: The Condemned Man's Bicycle, etc. translated by Barbara Wright, London: Calder and Boyars, 1967)
- 1965
  - Le grand cérémonial (Paris: Christian Bourgois) (Plays, Vol. 3: The Grand Ceremonial, etc. translated by Jean Benedetti; London: Calder and Boyars, 1970)
  - Cérémonie pour un noir assassiné (Paris: Christian Bourgois)
  - Cérémonie pour une chèvre et un nuage (Daily Bul)
- 1966
  - Le couronnement (Paris: Christian Bourgois)
  - Concert dans un oeuf (Paris: Christian Bourgois)
- 1967
  - L'architecte et l'empereur d'Assyrie (Paris: Christian Bourgois) (De Architekt en de Keiser van Assyrië, Amsterdam: Uitgeverij de Bezige Bij, 1969; Plays, Vol. 3: The Architect and the Emperor of Assyria translated by Jean Benedetti, London: Calder and Boyars, 1970; The Architect and the Emperor of Assyria translated by Everard d'Harnoncourt and Adele Shank, New York: Grove Press, 1969; Der Architekt und der Kaiser von Assyrien, Berlin: Kiepenheuer & Witsch, 1971; O Arquitecto e o Imperador da Assiria, São Paulo: Desta, 1976)
  - Les amours impossibles (Paris: Christian Bourgois) (Impossible Lovers, etc. translated by Bettina Knapp, The Drama Review 13, 1968, p. 71-86)
  - Les quatre cubes (Paris: Christian Bourgois)
  - La communion solennelle (Paris: Christian Bourgois) (First Communion translated by Michel Benedikt in Modern Spanish Theatre, New York: E. P. Dutton, 1968, p. 309–317; Solemn Communion, etc. translated by Bettina Knapp, The Drama Review 13, 1968, p. 71-86; Plays, Vol. 3: The Solemn Communion, etc. translated by John Calder, London: Calder and Boyars, 1970)
  - Streap-tease de la jalousie (Paris: Christian Bourgois) (Striptease of Jealousy, etc. translated by Bettina Knapp, The Drama Review 13, 1968, p. 71-86)
  - La jeunesse illustrée (Paris: Christian Bourgois)
  - Dieu est-il devenu fou? (Paris: Christian Bourgois)
- 1968
  - Le jardin des délices (Paris: Christian Bourgois) (Garden of Delights translated by Helen Gary Bishop and Tom Bishop, New York: Grove Press, 1974)
  - Bestialité érotique (Paris: Christian Bourgois)
  - Une tortue nommée Dostoïevski (Paris: Christian Bourgois)
  - Théâtre choisi (4 volumes en japonais) (Tokyo: Shichosha)
- 1969
  - ...Et ils passèrent des menottes aux fleurs (Paris: Christian Bourgois) (And They Put Handcuffs on the Flowers translated by Charles Marowitz, New York: Grove Press, 1973)
  - L'aurore rouge et noire (Groupuscule de mon coeur; Tous les parfums d'Arabie; Sous les pavés la plage; Les fillettes) (Paris: Christian Bourgois)
  - Le lai de Barrabas (Le couronnement) (Paris: Christian Bourgois)
- 1970
  - Happening at the Théâtre Plaisance in Paris in February (Grand-Guignol)
- 1972
  - Ars Amandi (opéra "Panique") (Paris: Christian Bourgois)
  - Dieu tenté par les mathématiques (opéra "Panique") (Paris: Christian Bourgois)
  - Le ciel et la merde (Paris: Christian Bourgois)
  - La grande revue du XXe siècle (Paris: Christian Bourgois)
- 1975
  - Jeunes barbares d'aujourd'hui (Paris: Christian Bourgois)
- 1976
  - La guerre de mille ans (Bella Ciao) (Paris: Christian Bourgois)
  - Sur le fil ou la ballade du train fantôme (Paris: Christian Bourgois)
- 1978
  - La tour de Babel (Oyez Patria mi affliccion) (Paris: Christian Bourgois)
  - La marche royale (Paris: Christian Bourgois)
  - Une orange sur le mont de Vénus (Paris: Christian Bourgois)
  - La gloire en images (Paris: Christian Bourgois)
  - Vole-moi un petit milliard (Théâtre Bouffe) (Paris: Christian Bourgois)
  - Le pastaga des loufs ou Ouverture Orang-outan (Théâtre Bouffe) (Paris: Christian Bourgois)
  - Punk et punk et colégram (Théâtre Bouffe) (Paris: Christian Bourgois)
- 1979
  - Inquisición (Granada: Don Quijote)
- 1980
  - Mon doux royaume saccagé (Paris: Christian Bourgois)
  - Le roi de Sodome (Paris: Christian Bourgois)
  - Le ciel et la merde II (Paris: Christian Bourgois)
- 1982
  - L'extravagante réussite de Jésus-Christ, Karl Marx et William Shakespeare (Paris: Christian Bourgois)
  - Lève-toi et rêve (Paris: Christian Bourgois)
- 1983
  - Le cheval-jument ou hommage à John Kennedy T.
- 1984
  - Les délices de la chair (Paris: Christian Bourgois)
  - La ville dont le prince était une princesse (Paris: Christian Bourgois)
- 1985
  - Bréviaire d'amour d'un haltérophile (Paris: Christian Bourgois)
  - Apokalyptica (Paris: Christian Bourgois)
  - La charge des centaures (Paris: Christian Bourgois)
- 1988
  - Les "cucarachas" de Yale (Paris: Christian Bourgois)
  - Une pucelle pour un gorille (Paris: Christian Bourgois)
  - La madonne rouge (Paris: Christian Bourgois)
  - La traversée de l'Empire (Paris: Christian Bourgois)
- 1989
  - L'extravagante croisade d'un révolutionnaire obese (Luxembourg: Phi)
- 1990
  - La nuit est aussi un soleil (Actes Sud)
  - Roues d'infortune (Actes Sud)
  - L'opéra de la Bastille (opéra écrit pour le bicentenaire de la Révolution française)
- 1992
  - Oeuvres Tome I (théâtre, poésie, roman) (Milan: Spirali – Vel)
- 1994
  - Lully (Actes Sud)
  - Entends la nuit douce qui marche (Actes Sud)
  - Le fou rire des liliputiens (Actes Sud)
- 1996
  - Comme un lis entre les épines (Actes Sud)
- 1997
  - Théâtre complet (7 volumes en langue coréenne) (Séoul: Coréenne)
- 1999
  - Lettre d'amour (Actes Sud)
  - Comme un supplice chinois (Actes Sud)
  - Théâtre complet (2 volumes en langue espagnole) (Madrid: Espasa)

Arrabal's plays were frequently produced at La MaMa Experimental Theatre Club in the East Village of Manhattan, New York City throughout the 1970s. Productions at La MaMa included:

- The Two Executioners (1962) directed by Andy Milligan; Arrabal performed alongside Martine Barrat
- Fando and Lis (1971) directed by Franz Marijnen
- Dos Obras de Arrabal (1972) directed by Delfor Peralta
- The Architect and the Emperor of Assyria (1976) directed by Tom O'Horgan
- The Architect and the Emperor of Assyria (1977) directed by Tom O'Horgan
- Dance/Theater of Richard S. Bach (1984) choreographed by Richard S. Bach

A traveling company from La MaMa also took The Architect and the Emperor of Assyria on tour to Philadelphia, Amsterdam, Venezuela, and Taormina in 1977–1979.

For a more extensive list of productions of Arrabal's plays, see his official website.

=== Paintings ===
- Arrabal has described himself as a "frustrated painter". He has produced approximately 50 canvases and 100 drawings and collages, which have been exhibited in museums such as the Paris Art Center, Musée de Bayeux, and the Villa San Carlo Borromeo Art Museum in Milan.
- His approach to painting involves close collaboration with artists who produce large-format oil paintings based on the detailed sketches he provides.
- In 1962, his first painting was chosen for reproduction in the art publication La Brèche: Action Surréaliste Revue by its founding editor, André Breton.
- Arrabal has collaborated with sculptor and video artist Christèle Jacob, with whom he has created a dozen videos and photomontage series, including Les artilleurs des échecs et de la littérature (The artillery corps of chess and literature), inspired by a 1909 artwork by Henri Rousseau.

=== Essays and non-fiction ===
- Carta al General Franco (bilingual Spanish-French edition, Paris: Bourgois, 1972, col. 10–18; Paris: Anonyme Anarchiste Pop, 1971; Buenos Aires: Granica, 1973; Noce: Babilonia, 1976; Barcelona: Actuales, 1978).
- Le Panique (Paris: Union Générale d'Edition, 1973).
- Sur Fischer: Initiation aux échecs (Monaco: du Rocher, 1974; Fischer, le roi maudit [revised edition], Luxembourg: Phi, 1988).
- Carta a los militantes comunistas españoles (Sueño y mentira del eurocomunismo) (bilingual Spanish-French edition, Paris: Bourgois, 1978; Barcelona: Actuales, 1978; Acción directa, 1980).
- Les échecs féeriques et libertaires (articles from L'Express) (Monaco: du Rocher, 1980).
- Carta a los comunistas españoles y otras cartas (Letters to Franco, to the King, etc.) (Murcia: Godoy, 1981).
- Carta a Fidel Castro (Madrid: Playor, 1983; Mexico: Diana, 1984; Europa, América, Portugal, 1984).
- Echecs et mythe (Paris: Payot, 1984; Mitos em Xeque, Río de Janeiro: Globo, 1988).
- Introducción a Feliciano de Silva (Cátedra, col. Letras Hispánicas, 1986).
- El Greco (Steidl, Kiepenheuer & Witsch, 1991; El Greco, Barcelona: Destino, 1991; El Greco, London: Calder and Boyars; New York: Grove Press – Viking, 1991; El Greco, Milan: Spirali, 1991; El Greco: Le frénétique du spasme, Paris: Flohic, 1991).
- Goya / Dalí (Milan: Spirali – Vel; Rome: Studio di Val Cervo, 1992).
- Fêtes et défaites sur l'échiquier (Paris: L'Archipel, 1992).
- Cartas a Baltazar (versión de F. Torres Monreal, 1993).
- Genios y figuras (preface by A. Berenguer, Espasa-Calpe, 1993).
- Las manazas del Samaritano. Conversaciones con Ionesco (La Vuelta, nº 210, mayo, 1994).
- La dudosa luz del día (translated into Spanish from the original French with notes by F. Torres Monreal, Espasa Calpe, 1994).
- Carta al Rey de España (Madrid: Espasa Calpe, 1995).
- Un esclave nommé Cervantès (Paris: Plon, 1996; Un esclavo llamado Cervantes, Madrid Espasa Calpe, 1996).
- Diccionario pánico (Bruxelles: Escritos, 1998).
- Lettre à Staline (Paris: Flammarion, 2004).
- Houellebecq! (Paris: Le cherche midi, 2005).
- El Pánico, Manifiesto para el tercer milenio, 2007.
- Diccionario pánico, 2008.
- Universos arrabalescos, 2009.
- Defensa de Kundera, 2009.

=== Interest in chess ===
Arrabal has a strong interest in chess and has attended many chess tournaments. He is close to American chess Grandmaster Gata Kamsky and advocated for Kamsky on his chess blog during Kamsky's negotiations with FIDE over a World Chess Championship match.

For over thirty years, Arrabal has written a column on chess for the French weekly news magazine L'Express. His columns have included, among many others:

- Echecs et mythes
- Fêtes et défaites sur l'échiquier
- Les échecs féériques et libertaires
- Bobby Fischer: el rey maldito
