= Cortot (surname) =

Cortot (English: /kɔːrˈtoʊ/, French: [ʒɑ̃ kɔʁto]) is a surname. Notable people with the surname include:

- Alfred Cortot (1877–1962), French pianist, conductor, and teacher
- Jean-Pierre Cortot (1787–1843), French sculptor
- Jean Cortot (1925–2018), French poet, painter, and illustrator
