= Christian Zeimert =

French painter and anarchist (1934–2020)

- Born: 17 October 1934; Paris, French Third Republic
- Died: 23 October 2020 (aged 86); Vernon, French Fifth Republic
- Occupation: Painter

Christian Zeimert (17 October 1934 – 23 October 2020) was a French painter.

== Biography ==
Zeimert was the son of an upholsterer and designer who also worked as a salesman and Le Bon Marché. After he left the École Boulle, he learned how to engrave on jewelry. He then studied at the École nationale supérieure des arts décoratifs, where he studied under the painter Marcel Gromaire.

A libertarian and anarchist, he worked alongside Fernando Arrabal, Alejandro Jodorowsky, Olivier O. Olivier, and Roland Topor and participated in the Panic Movement in the 1960s. He contributed to the newspaper Le Fou Parle and the magazine Hara-Kiri. Alongside Henri Cueco, Jacques Jouet, Hervé Le Tellier, and others, Zeimert was one of the "papous" on the program Des Papous dans la tête, aired on France Culture and hosted by Françoise Treussard.
