= Hélène Hazera =

French journalist and transgender rights activist (1952–2026)

- Hazera in 2017
- Born: 1952; Paris, France
- Died: 5 October 2026 (aged 74); Paris, France
- Occupations: Journalist; Activist

Hélène Hazera (French: [elˈɛn azʁˈa]; 1952 – 5 October 2026) was a French journalist and transgender rights activist.

== Life and career ==
Born in Paris in 1952, Hazera grew up in a violent household, interned in a psychiatric hospital at age 17 and receiving a diagnosis of bipolar disorder. Estranged from her family, she applied for entry into the Institut des hautes études cinématographiques, but her admission was blocked by the director, according to her testimony. She thereafter turned to sex work. At age 21, she came out as transgender and began her transition.

As a trans woman, Hazera befriended singer Marie France and joined the Front homosexuel d'action révolutionnaire and the Gazolines. She also appeared in the Adolfo Arrieta film Les Intrigues de Sylvia Couski in 1974. She then met photographer Nan Goldin, who was visiting Paris, and was photographed by her. In 1978, she joined the newspaper Libération and published a notable piece on music video director and producers in 1984. In 1985, she created a series of eight 26-minute documentaries titled Jean Painlevé au fil de ses films. In 2003, she produced a biopic about Nicole Louvier. From 2002 to 2017, she hosted the radio show Chansons dans la nuit on France Culture, followed by Chanson Boum. The shows centered around her passion for Arabic music. She was the subject of the 2025 documentary Hélène Trésore Transnationale, which first appeared at that year's Chéries-Chéris film festival. It was released nationally on 1 April 2026.

Hazera died on 5 October 2026, at the age of 74.

== Filmography ==
- Les Intrigues de Sylvia Couski (1975)
- Tam Tam (1976)
- Every Man for Himself (1980)
- Hélène Trésore Transnationale (2025)
