= Annie Girardot =

French actress (1931–2011)

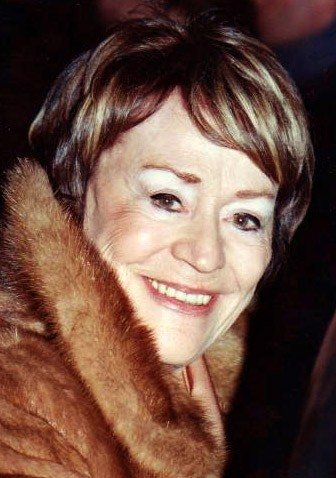
- Girardot in 2005
- Born: Annie Suzanne Girardot; 25 October 1931; Paris, France
- Died: 28 February 2011 (aged 79); Paris, France
- Resting place: Père Lachaise Cemetery
- Occupation: Actress
- Years active: 1950–2008
- Spouse: Renato Salvatori (m. 1962; died 1988)

Annie Suzanne Girardot (French: [ani ʒiʁaʁdo]; 25 October 1931 – 28 February 2011) was a French actress. She often played strong-willed, independent, hard-working, and often lonely women, imbuing her characters with an earthiness and reality that endeared her to women undergoing similar daily struggles.

Over the course of a five-decade career, she starred in nearly 150 films. She was a three-time César Award winner (1977, 1996, 2002), a two-time Molière Award winner (2002), a David di Donatello Award winner (1977), a BAFTA nominee (1962), and a recipient of several international prizes including the Volpi Cup (Best actress) at the 1965 Venice Film Festival for Three Rooms in Manhattan.

== Breakthrough and early career ==
After graduating from the Conservatoire de la rue Blanche in 1954 with two First Prizes in Modern and Classical Comedy, Girardot joined the Comédie Française, where she was a resident actor from 1954 to 1957.

She made her film debut in Thirteen at the Table (Treize à table, 1955), but it was with theatre that she was beginning to attract the attention of critics. Her performance in a revival of Jean Cocteau's play La Machine à écrire in 1956 was lauded by the author who called her "The finest dramatic temperament of the Postwar period". In 1958, Luchino Visconti directed her opposite Jean Marais in a French stage adaptation of William Gibson's Two for the Seesaw.

Girardot with Renato Salvatori in Luchino Visconti's Rocco and His Brothers (1960)

In 1956, she was awarded the Prix Suzanne Bianchetti as best up-and-coming young actress, but only with Luchino Visconti's epic Rocco e i suoi fratelli (Rocco and His Brothers, 1960), was she able to draw the public's attention. In 1962, she married Italian actor Renato Salvatori. Travelling back and forth between France and Italy, Girardot worked with Italian directors such as Marco Ferreri, appearing in three of his films, including the controversial The Ape Woman (1964) and Dillinger Is Dead (1968). She found success in popular French cinema alongside directors such as Jean Delannoy, Marcel Carné, Michel Boisrond, André Cayatte, Gilles Grangier, or André Hunebelle. In 1968, she also starred in the French anti-consumerism film Erotissimo (director Gérard Pirès).

== The 1970s ==
By the end of the 1960s, she had become a movie star and a box-office magnet in France with such films as Vice and Virtue (1963); Live for Life (1967); Love Is a Funny Thing (1969); and To Die of Love (1971), the fact-based tale of Gabrielle Russier (1937–1969), a thirty year old teacher whose affair with a much younger student made her the object of bourgeoisie ridicule. The film was nominated for a Golden Globe, and remains Girardot's biggest box office hit in France.

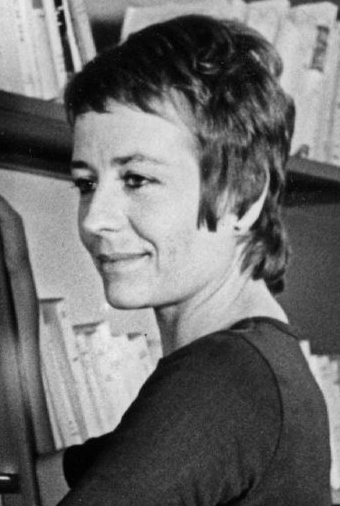
Girardot in 1970

Throughout the 1970s, Girardot moved back and forth between drama and comedy, appearing in such successful comedies as Claude Zidi's La Zizanie, Michel Audiard's She Does Not Drink, Smoke or Flirt But... She Talks (Elle boit pas, elle fume pas, elle drague pas, mais... elle cause !, 1970) or Philippe de Broca's Dear Inspector (Tendre poulet, 1977). She starred in the teen movie, The Slap (La Gifle, 1974) as Isabelle Adjani's mother. In 1972, she said in an interview to The New York Times, citing as Exhibit A her role as a sideshow freak in The Ape Woman, "I think I've proven that I'm opposed to typecasting. I believe that the acting of any role — from duchess to kitchen slavey — must be a form of transformation". She won her first César Award for Best Actress portraying the title character in the drama Docteur Françoise Gailland (1976). Throughout the 1970s, she was the highest-paid actress in France, and was nicknamed "La Girardot" by the press as her name alone was seen as enough to guarantee the success of a film. Between the release of Live for Life (1967) and Jupiter's Thigh (1980), 24 of her films have attracted more than one million admissions in France. On stage she had success with Madame Marguerite, which became her signature role that she reprised on numerous occasions until 2002. That year she was awarded the Molière Award for this role, along with an Honorary Molière Award for her entire stage career.

Girardot became one of the symbols of the 1970s feminist movement in France, as the audience embraced the "everywoman" quality she brought to the strong-minded female characters she regularly played in both dramas and comedies. In her 1989 autobiography, Vivre d'aimer, she wrote: "People didn't come to watch a beautiful, vamp-like creature, but simply a woman. [...] I played a judge, a lawyer, a taxi driver, a cop, a surgeon. I was never a glamorous star."

== From the 1980s onwards: Fading stardom and comeback ==
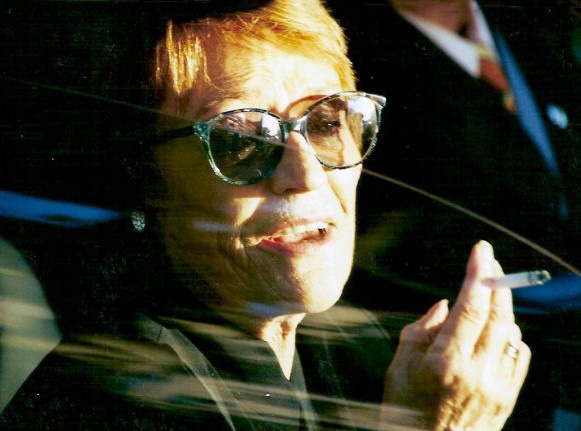
Girardot at Cannes festival in 2000

The 1980s were less kind, as her career floundered and parts dwindled. In 1983, she lost a fortune when Revue Et Corrigée, the musical show she put on and starred in at the Casino de Paris, flopped. In 1989, she published her autobiography Vivre d'aimer. She suffered from depression but bounced back with several television series in France and Italy. However, Girardot had a major comeback on the big screen playing a peasant wife in Claude Lelouch's Les Misérables (1995). The role won her a second César Award for Best Supporting Actress in 1996. Upon accepting the award, a joyous and tearful Girardot expressed her happiness that she had not been forgotten by the film industry. In 1992, she was the Head of the Jury at the 42nd Berlin International Film Festival.

She was awarded the César Award for Best Supporting Actress for her role in Michael Hanekes' The Piano Teacher (2001). She collaborated with Haneke again in Caché (2005).

Girardot is the highest ranked woman in the list of French stars who have appeared in the most movies that have attracted more than one million admissions in France since 1945, with 44 films.

== Personal life, illness and death ==
She married Italian actor Renato Salvatori in 1962. They had a daughter, Giulia, and later separated but never divorced. Salvatori died in 1988.

After going public in the 21 September 2006 issue of Paris Match with the news that she was suffering from Alzheimer's disease, she became a symbol of the illness in France. On 28 February 2011, Girardot died in a hospital in Paris, aged 79. She was interred at Père-Lachaise Cemetery, in Paris.

== Legacy ==
- 17 French municipalities have named streets after her, including the 13th arrondissement of Paris, Toulouse, Angers, etc.
- In October 2012, France's Postal service has issued a collection of stamps dedicated to six major figures of French Post-War cinema, including Annie Girardot.
- In 2013, the 37th annual César Awards 2012 selected a picture of Annie Girardot from the 1962 film Rocco and His Brothers as the official promotional poster of the ceremony, during which she was paid tribute with a retrospective montage of her most memorable roles in film.
- Sancar Seckiner's book South (Güney), published July 2013, consists of 12 article and essays. One of them, "Girardot's Eyes", highlights broader commentary of Annie Girardot's performances in the cinema of art. ISBN 978-605-4579-45-7.

== Filmography ==
Year	Title	Role	Director	Notes
1950	Pigalle-Saint-Germain-des-Prés	Une jeune fille	André Berthomieu	
1955	Thirteen at the Table	Véronique Chambon	André Hunebelle	
1956	Le Pays d'où je viens	Minor Role	Marcel Carné	Uncredited
1956	L'Homme aux clés d'or	Gisèle Delmar / Lewarden	Léo Joannon	
1957	The Schemer	Viviane	Gilles Grangier	
1957	Speaking of Murder	Hélène	Gilles Grangier	
1957	Love Is at Stake	Marie-Blanche Fayard	Marc Allégret	
1958	Maigret Sets a Trap	Yvonne Maurin	Jean Delannoy	
1958	Le Désert de Pigalle	Josy	Léo Joannon	
1959	Bobosse		Étienne Périer	Uncredited
1960	Lovers on a Tightrope	Cora	Jean-Charles Dudrumet	
1960	Recours en grâce	Lilla	László Benedek	
1960	Rocco and His Brothers	Nadia	Luchino Visconti	
1960	Love and the Frenchwoman	Danielle		(segment "Divorce, Le")
1961	La Proie pour l'ombre	Anna Kraemmer	Alexandre Astruc	
1961	Rendezvous	Madeleine	Jean Delannoy	
1961	Famous Love Affairs	Mademoiselle Duchesnois	Michel Boisrond	(segment "Les Comédiennes")
1962	Le Bateau d'Émile	Fernande Malanpin	Denys de La Patellière	
1962	Le Crime ne paie pas	Gabrielle Fenayrou	Gérard Oury	(segment "L'affaire Fenayrou")
1962	Smog	Gabriella	Franco Rossi	
1962	Pourquoi Paris?		Denys de La Patellière	
1963	The Shortest Day	L'infermiera	Sergio Corbucci	
1963	Vice and Virtue	Juliette Morand ("Vice")	Roger Vadim	
1963	The Organizer	Niobe	Mario Monicelli	
1963	Outlaws of Love	Margherita	Paolo and Vittorio Taviani and Valentino Orsini	
1964	La Bonne Soupe	Marie / Marinette / Maryse / Marie-Paule jeune	Robert Thomas	
1964	The Ape Woman	Maria	Marco Ferreri	
1964	L'autre femme	Agnès	François Villiers	
1964	La ragazza in prestito	Clara	Alfredo Giannetti	
1964	Male Companion	Clara	Philippe de Broca	
1964	Beautiful Families	Maria	Ugo Gregoretti	(segment "Il principe azzurro")
1965	Déclic et des claques	Sandra	Philippe Clair	
1965	Una voglia da morire	Eleonora	Duccio Tessari	
1965	The Dirty Game	Suzette / Monique	Christian-Jaque	
1965	Three Rooms in Manhattan	Kay Larsi	Marcel Carné	
1967	The Witches	Valeria	Luchino Visconti	(segment "Strega Bruciata Viva, La")
1967	Live for Life	Catherine Colomb	Claude Lelouch	
1967	The Journalist	Herself	Sergei Gerasimov	
1968	La Bande à Bonnot	Maria la Belge	Philippe Fourastié	
1968	It Rains in My Village	Reza	Aleksandar Petrović	
1969	Dillinger Is Dead	Sabine	Marco Ferreri	
1969	Metti una sera a cena	Giovanna	Giuseppe Patroni Griffi	
1969	Les Gauloises bleues	the mother	Michel Cournot	
1969	Erotissimo	Annie	Gérard Pirès	
1969	Love Is a Funny Thing	Françoise	Claude Lelouch	
1969	The Seed of Man	the unknown woman	Marco Ferreri	
1969	Life Love Death	Herself	Claude Lelouch	cameo appearance
1970	Story of a Woman	Liliana	Leonardo Bercovici	
1970	Elle boit pas, elle fume pas, elle drague pas, mais... elle cause !	Germaine	Michel Audiard	
1970	Les Novices	Mona Lisa	Guy Casaril	
1970	Le clair de terre	Maria	Guy Gilles	
1971	To Die of Love	Danièle Guénot	André Cayatte	
1972	The Old Maid	Muriel Bouchon	Jean-Pierre Blanc	
1972	Sweet Deception	Séverine	Édouard Molinaro	
1972	Hearth Fires	Marie Louise Boursault	Serge Korber	
1972	Elle cause plus... elle flingue	Rosemonde du Bois de la Faisanderie	Michel Audiard	
1973	Shock Treatment	Hélène Masson	Alain Jessua	
1973	There's No Smoke Without Fire	Sylvie Peyrac	André Cayatte	
1974	Ursule et Grelu	Ursule	Serge Korber	
1974	Juliette and Juliette	Juliette Vidal	Remo Forlani	
1974	La Gifle	Hélène Douélan	Claude Pinoteau	
1975	The Suspect	Teresa	Francesco Maselli	
1975	Il faut vivre dangereusement	Léone	Claude Makovski	
1975	The Gypsy	Ninie	José Giovanni	
1975	Il pleut sur Santiago	Maria Olivares	Helvio Soto	
1976	Docteur Françoise Gailland	Françoise Gailland	Jean-Louis Bertucelli	
1976	D'amour et d'eau fraîche	Mona	Jean-Pierre Blanc	
1976	Cours après moi que je t'attrape	Jacqueline	Robert Pouret	
1977	À chacun son enfer	Madeleine Girard	André Cayatte	
1977	Jambon d'Ardenne	La patronne du Beauséjour	Benoît Lamy	
1977	Le Dernier Baiser	Annie	Dolorès Grassian	
1977	Tendre Poulet	Lise Tanquerelle	Philippe de Broca	
1977	Le Point de mire	Danièle Gaur	Jean-Claude Tramont	
1977	L'affaire			
1978	La Zizanie	Bernadette Daubray-Lacaze	Claude Zidi	
1978	Vas-y maman	Annie Larcher	Nicole de Buron	
1978	L'Amour en question	Suzanne Corbier	André Cayatte	
1978	La Clé sur la porte	Marie Arnault	Yves Boisset	
1979	Traffic Jam	Irène	Luigi Comencini	
1979	Le Cavaleur	Lucienne	Philippe de Broca	
1979	Cause toujours... tu m'intéresses!	Christine Clément	Édouard Molinaro	
1979	Bobo Jacco	Magda	Walter Bal	
1980	Jupiter's Thigh	Lise Tanquerelle	Philippe de Broca	
1980	Le coeur à l'envers	Laure / Mother	Franck Appréderis	
1981	Une robe noire pour un tueur	Florence Nat	José Giovanni	
1981	All Night Long	French teacher	Jean-Claude Tramont	
1981	La vie continue	Jeanne	Moshé Mizrahi	
1981	La revanche	Jeanne Jouvert	Pierre Lary	
1984	Liste noire	Jeanne Dufour	Alain Bonnot	
1984	Souvenirs, souvenirs	Emma Boccara	Ariel Zeitoun	
1985	Adieu Blaireau	Colette	Bob Decout	
1985	Partir, revenir	Hélène Rivière	Claude Lelouch	
1985	Mussolini and I	Rachele Mussolini	Alberto Negrin	TV Mini-Series, 4 episodes
1988	Prisonnières	Marthe	Charlotte Silvera	
1989	Cinq jours en juin	Marcelle	Michel Legrand	
1989	The Legendary Life of Ernest Hemingway	Gertrude Stein	José María Sánchez	
1989	Comédie d'amour	Le Fléau	Jean-Pierre Rawson	
1989	Ruf		Valeri Akhadov	
1990	Il y a des jours... et des lunes	the lone woman	Claude Lelouch	
1990	Faccia di lepre	Marlene	Liliana Ginanneschi	
1991	Merci la vie	Évangeline Pelleveau	Bertrand Blier	
1991	Toujours seuls	Mme Chevillard	Gérard Mordillat	
1992	Alibi perfetto	Countess		
1993	Portagli i miei saluti... avanzi di galera	Laura Albani		
1994	Les Braqueuses	Cécile's mother	Jean-Paul Salomé	
1995	Les Misérables	Madame Thénardier (1942)	Claude Lelouch	
1996	Les Bidochon	La mère Bidochon	Serge Korber	
1997	Shanghai 1937	Mme. Tissaud	Peter Patzak	TV movie
1998	Préférence	Blanche	Gregoire Delacourt	
1998	When I Will Be Gone (L'Âge de braise)	Caroline Bonhomme	Jacques Leduc	
2000	T'aime	Emma	Patrick Sébastien	
2001	The Piano Teacher	Mother	Michael Haneke	
2001	Ceci est mon corps	Mamie	Rodolphe Marconi	
2002	Epstein's Night	Hannah Liebermann	Urs Egger	
2003	Raining Cats and Frogs	L'éléphante	Jacques-Rémy Girerd	Voice
2005	Let's Be Friends	Madame Mendelbaum	Éric Toledano and Olivier Nakache	
2005	Hidden	Mother of Georges	Michael Haneke	
2006	Le Temps des porte-plumes	Alphonsine	Daniel Duval	
2006	A City Is Beautiful at Night	The Grandmother	Richard Bohringer	
2007	Boxes	Joséphine	Jane Birkin	
2007	Christian	Odile	Elisabeth Löchen	(final film role)

== Honours and awards ==
- Chevalier of the Order of Legion of Honour (1999)
- Commandeur of the Ordre des Arts et des Lettres
