= Leonardo Bercovici =

American film director (1908–1995)

- Born: January 4, 1908; Brooklyn, New York, US
- Died: November 22, 1995; Los Angeles, California, US
- Occupation: Screenwriter
- Years active: 1935–1995
- Spouse(s): Frances Ellis (married ?–1951); Märta Torén (married 1952–1957)
- Children: at least two, including Eric Bercovici
- Relatives: Konrad Bercovici (uncle); Luca Bercovici (grandson)

Leonardo Bercovici (January 4, 1908 – November 22, 1995) was an American screenwriter, film director, and producer.

== Blacklisting and aftermath ==
Bercovici was called to testify before the House Un-American Activities Committee and blacklisted. He was named by Edward Dmytryk and Richard Collins. On May 16, 1951, he swore he was not a member of the Communist Party, and invoked his fifth amendment right to not incriminate himself when he was asked whether he had been a member in the past. He moved to Europe and worked in the European film industry until about 1958, when it was announced he would write the Tyrone Power film Two Against Tomorrow, but Power's death ended the project.

== Personal life ==
Bercovici was the son of Joseph Bercovici, brother of Konrad Bercovici. He first married Frances Ellis; she died in an apparent suicide on May 23, 1951, while Bercovici was being investigated for Communist activities.

Bercovici married Swedish stage and film actress Märta Torén in June 1952; she died in 1957. They had one daughter, Kristina.

His son Eric Bercovici became a screenwriter and producer, as did Bercovici's grandson, Luca Bercovici.

== Selected credits ==
=== Film ===
Title	Year	Role(s)
The Preacher's Wife	1996	Earlier screenplay The Bishop's Wife
Story of a Woman	1970	Director, Producer, Writer
Square of Violence	1961	Director, Producer, Writer
Under Ten Flags	1960	Screenplay – Originally uncredited
Torment of Love	1956	Director Writer
Monsoon	1952	Writer
Kiss the Blood off My Hands	1948	Writer
Portrait of Jennie	1948	Adaptation
The Lost Moment	1947	Writer
The Bishop's Wife	1947	Writer
Moss Rose	1947	Contributor to screenplay construction – uncredited
Chasing Danger	1939	Story
Racket Busters	1938	Original screenplay
Prison Train	1938	Story

=== Television ===
Title	Year	Episode	Role
Police Story	1976	"Payment Deferred"	Story
Ironside	1975	"A Matter of Life or Death	Story
Petrocelli	1974	"The Golden Cage	Story
The Streets of San Francisco	1974	"Cry Help!"	Story
Police Story	1974	"Fathers and Sons"	Story
TV de Vanguarda	1955	"O Momento Perdido"	Undetermined

=== Theatre ===
Title	Year	Role	Notes
Gabrielle	1941	Written by	Based on Tristan by Thomas Mann)
The Holmeses of Baker Street	1936–1937	Adapted by	
Substitute for Murder	1935	Written by	
