= Marie France =

French actress and singer

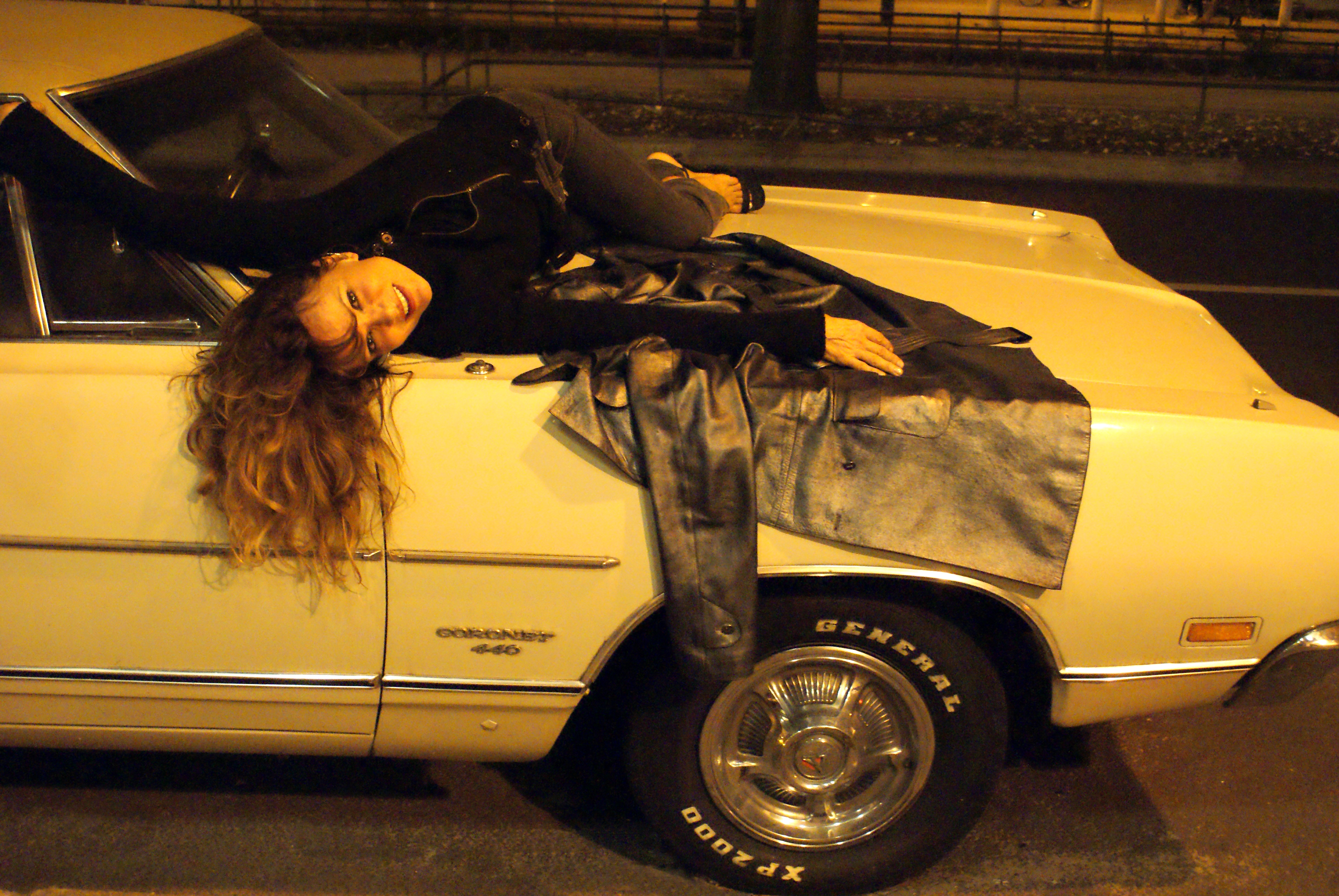
- Marie-France after her show at the Bassy Club, Berlin, 21 September 2008
- Born: 9 February 1946; Oran
- Awards: Chevalier des Arts et des Lettres (Frédéric Mitterrand, 2011)

Marie-France Garcia, known professionally as Marie France (born 9 February 1946 in Oran, French Algeria) is a French singer and actress. She is a transgender Parisian pop icon of the 1970s.

== Biography ==
Marie-France was hired in 1969 by the Alcazar cabaret bar in the Latin Quarter of Paris, where she gained recognition by portraying Marilyn Monroe. She remained one of the celebrities of that music-hall until 1987. She became a member of Front homosexuel d'action révolutionnaire (FHAR, 'Homosexual Front of Revolutionary Action'), alongside Guy Hocquenghem. As a member of FHAR, she was interviewed in the magazine Recherches (special issue "Trois milliards de pervers" (3 billion perverts), 1973). She was a member of a small group, the Gazolines, with Hélène Hazera. The two performed in Les Intrigues de Sylvia Couski by Adolfo Arrieta (1974).

Marie-France was often referred to as transsexual, a word that she disliked, and one which certain television hosts automatically questioned. "When one has passed onto the other side, why do they keep this title?" she regrets.

She appeared as a singer in Barocco by André Téchiné in 1976, where she produced "On se voit se voir", a song written by Philippe Sarde. She pursued her acting career in theater, notably in Le Navire Night by Marguerite Duras in 1979. She recorded the album 39 de Fièvre (39 °C Fever) in 1980, performing several renditions of 1960s pop (Gillian Hils, Johnny Hallyday, Sylvie Vartan, Rocky Volcano). She appeared in the film Les Innocents, directed by Téchiné in 1987. In 1993, she recorded a song by Édith Piaf with Marc Almond. Daniel Darc and Mirwais collaborated with her in 1997 on her eponymous album. Dave then invited her on his album Doux tam tam in 2003. Frédéric Botton wrote several songs for her in 2005. At the end of 2006, Léonard Lasry and Marie France sang a duet titled "Du désir au bout des doigts". This song is featured on the first Léonard Lasry album Des Illusions.

Marie France also published a duet with Hélèna Noguerra on her last album, released in October 2007. In 2008, Marie France recorded a rock'n'roll garage album entirely written by Jacques Duvall and composed by Miam Monster Miam. The album is titled Phantom feat. Marie France.

== Filmography ==
- 1972: Les Intrigues de Silvia Couski by Adolfo Arrieta (as Carmen)
- 1973: I Will Walk Like a Crazy Horse by Fernando Arrabal
- 1974: Le Jardin des Hespérides by Jacques Robiolles
- 1974: Le Sujet ou le Secrétaire aux mille et un tiroirs by Joaquin Noessi and Joaquin Lledo
- 1975: Spermula by Charles Matton (as Rita)
- 1976: Barocco by André Téchiné (as The Singer)
- 1985: Billy Ze Kick by Gérard Mordillat
- 1985: Love Circles (French: La Ronde de l'Amour) (as Suzy)
- 1987: Cinématon n°949 by Gérard Courant
- 1987: Les Innocents by André Téchiné (as The Singer)
- 1987: Les keufs by Josiane Balasko (as The coach)
- 1991: La Gamine by Hervé Palud
- 1994: Une expérience d'hypnose télévisuelle (short film) by Gaspar Noé
- 1998: Belle Maman by Gabriel Aghion (as Marie-Claude, known as la Pute, 'the whore')
- 2003: Alain Pacadis, un héros "in" (medium-length documentary) by Grégory Hervelin and Vladimir Tybin (as herself)
- 2003: Le Fantôme d'Henri Langlois (documentary) by Jacques Richard (as herself)
- 2010: L'Orpheline avec en plus un bras en moins de Jacques Richard
- 2011: Chéries-Chéris de Antony Hickling (short film): as herself with Christine Mingo

== Discography ==
- "Daisy / Déréglée" (1977) – single (Romantik)
- "Los Angeles / Marie Françoise se suicide" (1978) – single (Phonogram)
- 39 de fièvre (1981) – album (RCA)
- "Je ne me quitterai jamais / Corps Diplomatique" (1982) – single (RCA)
- "Champs Elysées / Est-ce que vous avez du feu?" (1983) – single (RCA)
- Marie et Marc (1996) – limited edition mini-album (Freedom 001)
- Marie France (1997) – album (Last Call)
- Raretés (2006) – album (Edina)
- Phantom featuring Marie France (2008) – album (Freaksville records)
- Marie France visite Bardot (2009) (JPB Production)
- Marie France Chante Jacques Duvall (2016) – Album (Freaksville records)

== Quotes ==
- About her, Marguerite Duras said: "It is impossible to not be aroused by her. Everyone. Women as well as men."

== Bibliography ==
- Garcia, Marie-France, Elle était une fois, ed. Denoël, 2003 (coll. X-Treme).
