= Billy Ze Kick (film) =

1985 film

- Directed by: Gérard Mordillat
- Written by: Gérard Guérin; Gérard Mordillat
- Starring: Francis Perrin; Dominique Lavanant; Zabou Breitman; Marie France
- Cinematography: Jean Monsigny
- Edited by: Michèle Catonné
- Music by: Jean-Claude Petit
- Distributed by: Acteurs Auteurs Associés
- Release date: 18 December 1985
- Running time: 90 minutes
- Country: France
- Language: French

Billy Ze Kick is a 1985 French film directed by Gérard Mordillat. Zabou Breitman received a César nomination for Most Promising Actress.

== Plot ==
Billy Ze Kick is the name of a fictional serial killer in a bedtime story that a police inspector reads to his daughter. Soon three girls turn up murdered in his neighbourhood, and the killer leaves a note signed "Billy Ze Kick."

== Cast ==
- Francis Perrin as Inspecteur Chapeau
- Dominique Lavanant as Madame Achere
- Zabou Breitman as Juliette Chapeau
- Marie France as Miss Peggy
- Patrice Valota as Eugene
- Jacques Pater as Inspecteur Cordier
- Pascal Pistacio as Hippo
- Cérise Bloc as Julie-Berthe
- Michael Lonsdale as Commissaire Bellanger
- Yves Robert as Alcide
- Benjamin Azenstarck as Ed
