= Gustavo Charif =

Argentine writer, visual artist and film director

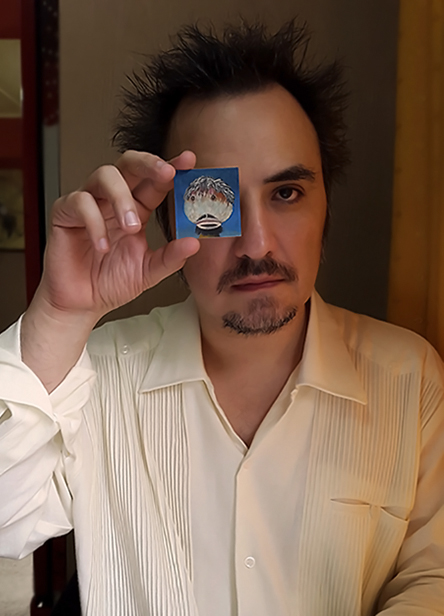
- Charif in Singapore, 2016
- Born: Gustavo Eduardo Charif al-Hāshim; August 18, 1966 (age 60); Buenos Aires, Argentina
- Website: infinilogy.wordpress.com

Gustavo Charif (born Gustavo Eduardo Charif al-Hāshim; August 18, 1966, in Buenos Aires) is an Argentine writer, visual artist and film director. His works are a sort of Dadaism mixed with the secular poetry of actual times.

In 1997 the Buenos Aires Museum of Modern Art organized a retrospective of his experimental short films.

In 2002 Fernando Arrabal and Milan Kundera planned their first artist book together and invited Charif to make the images. In the same year, Daniel Maman Fine Arts edited the "Incarnate Manifesto" for the big solo exhibition in the gallery.

He has developed actions as the canonization of Luce Moreau Arrabal at the front door of the Notre-Dame of Paris, giving her the title of Saint Lis with the presence of the Collège de 'Pataphysyque.

The Centro Cultural Borges organized the solo show "Alexandria" in 2004, where the artist book with Arrabal and Kundera is exhibited for the first time.

In 2005 he founded the Infinilogy movement with Victorio Lenz (Charif's pseudonym), Andres Onna and Agares Graber.

His first feature-length film, The Reason, was released in 2010 and the soundtrack includes an unreleased track by Moby.

In 2012 he represented Argentina at the International Art Expo Malaysia.

In 2013 the Embassy of the State of Qatar in Kuala Lumpur requested him an artwork that portrays his personal vision of Qatar. The work was exhibited on 16 May at the "Peace & Security Forum", in the Ritz Carlton of Kuala Lumpur. After this his artworks were shown in Art Osaka (Japan), and in Cutlog, contemporary art fair (Paris 2013 and New York 2014).

In 2015 he took part in "The Selfie Show" in the Museum of New Art, Detroit, USA, and in 2016 presents his big installation "Ailanthus, or The Living Museum of Art by Nature", invited by the Guandu International Nature Art Festival (Taipei, Taiwan).

In 2017 he makes a music video for Dimesland, band of the guitar player Nolan Cook.

In 2018 his work became part of the heritage of the Museo Nacional de Bellas Artes (Buenos Aires).

In 2019 directed "Ophelia Moment", a Chris Connelly (musician) official music video.

== Selected exhibitions ==
- 1997: The Buenos Aires Museum of Modern Art organized Charif' first retrospective of his experimental films.
- 1997: "Forgeries", first solo show in the Elía-Robirosa Foundation in Buenos Aires.
- 1998: "Charif Painted in Gold", performance at the doors of the Museo Nacional de Bellas Artes (Buenos Aires).
- 1998: first presentation in the arteBA International Art Fair, in Buenos Aires.
- 2000: "Kaléidoscopies", group exhibition at the Musée Baron-Gérard, France.
- 2002: "Alquimia Profana", solo show in Maman Fine Art, Buenos Aires. The catalogue includes an introduction by Fernando Arrabal and a short letter from Milan Kundera.
- 2002: "Viande", Espace Accattone, Paris, France.
- 2002: "Sainte Lis", performance at the doors of Notre-Dame de Paris with the presence of the Collège de 'Pataphysique.
- 2004: "Alexandria", solo show in the Centro Cultural Borges, Buenos Aires.
- 2006: "Homenaje a Cervantes", group exhibition at the Pontifical Catholic University of Argentina.
- 2007: "Coleção Elia-Robirosa", group exhibition at the Oscar Niemeyer Museum in Brazil.
- 2012: solo show in Art Expo Malaysia, Kuala Lumpur.
- 2012: "Lamborghini Odyssey", individual performance at the Lamborghini Showroom, Kuala Lumpur.
- 2012: "Malaysian Art", group exhibition at the Henry Butcher Art Auctioneers, Kuala Lumpur.
- 2013: "Absolute Charif", solo show at the Maison Française, Kuala Lumpur.
- 2013: presentation of a big canvas commissioned by Embassy of the State of Qatar in Malaysia for the International Peace & Security Forum.
- 2013: Art Osaka, international art fair, group exhibition in Japan.
- 2013: Art Expo Malaysia, international art fair, group exhibition.
- 2013: Cutlog Paris, group exhibition in France.
- 2013: Cutlog New York, group exhibition in the United States.
- 2015: "The Selfie Show", group exhibition at the Museum of New Art, MONA, in Detroit, United States.
- 2016: "Ailhantus", solo show in the Guandu International Nature Art Festival, at the Guandu Nature Park in Taipei, Taiwan.
- 2024: "Lo negro", solo show in the Centro Cultural Contraviento, Rosario, Argentina.
