= The Lost Moment =

1947 film by Martin Gabel

- Directed by: Martin Gabel
- Screenplay by: Leonardo Bercovici
- Based on: The Aspern Papers by Henry James
- Produced by: Walter Wanger
- Starring: Robert Cummings; Susan Hayward; Agnes Moorehead
- Cinematography: Hal Mohr
- Edited by: Milton Carruth
- Music by: Daniele Amfitheatrof
- Production company: Walter Wanger Productions
- Distributed by: Universal Pictures
- Release date: November 21, 1947 (United States)
- Running time: 89 minutes
- Country: United States
- Language: English
- Budget: $1,313,775
- Box office: $734,357

The Lost Moment is a 1947 American Gothic psychological thriller film directed by Martin Gabel and starring Robert Cummings, Susan Hayward and Agnes Moorehead.

The film was not well received at the time, but its reputation has risen in recent years.

== Plot ==
Lewis Venable, an American publisher, travels from New York to Venice, seeking to buy the 19th-century love letters of the late poet Jeffrey Ashton to a woman named Juliana Bordereau. He learns from a living poet, Charles Russell, that Juliana is still alive at 105. Lewis lodges at Juliana's residence, having assumed a false identity named William Burton, a wealthy American writer. There, he meets her great-niece Tina, who escorts Lewis to meet Juliana.

During their meeting, Juliana is in dire need of money, and Lewis pays her a thousand francs in gold for his three-month stay. Six weeks later, Lewis writes a letter to his girlfriend Kathleen he has not found Ashton's letters. As he hears nearby piano playing, Juliana calls Lewis into her room, where she offers to sell him a valuable painting of Ashton for a thousand English pounds. Lewis agrees to pay, in which Juliana also wants the painting given to Father Rinaldo.

Lewis evidently learns Tina is the pianist, appearing strikingly different from her reserved look. She even addresses Lewis as Ashton. The next morning, Lewis explains to this to Father Rinaldo, who requests for Lewis to leave the house before anything bad happens. Meanwhile, Charles arrives at the estate, and tries to blackmail Lewis by threatening to reveal his true identity and his interest in acquiring the letters.

Lewis meets again with Juliana, who explains that Tina has dissociative identity disorder; at times believing that she is Juliana and the object of Ashton's love letters and believing the elderly Juliana is Rosa, their housekeeper from long ago. Juliana further explains that Tina's identity disorder is because of her obsession with Ashton's love letters, which Juliana read to her as a child. She asks Lewis to regain the letters for her.

Later that night, Lewis follows the disturbed Tina into the courtyard, where they dance until he hears Juliana screams. A mysterious man falls from Juliana's window, and Lewis chases him but the man escapes. Returning to her usual self, Tina accuses Lewis of attacking Juliana, but Juliana denies he's the attacker. Father Rinaldo apologizes to Lewis for thinking he was a "scoundrel," and tells him that if Tina could find love in the present, then she might escape her obsession with the past.

At a restaurant, Lewis and Tina have dinner and dance together, while Charles writes a note exposing Lewis's identity. He is caught trespassing while he drops the note, and runs out. Back at the estate, Tina denies the letters exist but Lewis doesn't believe her. As he searches Juliana's room, Lewis finds the letters and prepares to leave until he hears Juliana scream. Lewis finds Tina (as Juliana) arguing with her aunt, in which Juliana confesses she killed Ashton and buried him in the garden.

As Lewis and Tina head downstairs, Juliana faints and knocks over a candle which accidentally sets the house on fire. Lewis manages to rescue her from the burning house, but she dies almost immediately. The precious letters are consumed in the conflagration, and Tina, freed from the past, embraces Lewis.

== Cast ==
- Robert Cummings as Lewis Venable
- Susan Hayward as Tina Bordereau
- Agnes Moorehead as Juliana Bordereau
- Joan Lorring as Amelia
- Eduardo Ciannelli as Father Rinaldo
- John Archer as Charles Russell
- Frank Puglia as Pietro
- Minerva Urecal as Maria
- William Edmunds as Vittorio

== Production ==
The film was produced at Universal Pictures by Walter Wanger, from a screenplay by Leonardo Bercovici based on the 1888 novella The Aspern Papers by Henry James. Bercovici wrote the script in 1946 for Charles Feldman who developed several projects for the property. Wanger bought the script in January 1947 for a reported $200,000. (In fact no money changed hands - Wanger bought the script in exchange for a scenario called The Washington Flyer.)

The script was called The Lost Love. Wanger said the script would be directed by Martin Gabel, who had just worked as producer on Smash-Up, the Story of a Woman for Wanger; that film starred Susan Hayward who would be in the new movie as well.

Wanger said the character of James Aspern was a combination of Shelley, Keats and Byron. He would change the name of Aspern to Ashton to avoid "exploitation of the Bayer product."

In late February, Robert Cummings signed to make the film, which was then called The Lost Love. (He was scheduled to do The Big Curtain for Edward Alperson afterwards.) Filming began March 10, 1947.

The set was not a tranquil one, with Hayward and Gabel quarreling over his interruptions of her line readings. After warning her director to stop, she reportedly picked up a lamp and threw it at him. Gabel never directed another motion picture.

In April the film was retitled The Lost Moment.

The eerie atmosphere in the Venetian home was achieved through "tenebrous lighting, solemn rhythms and emphasis in music and sounds". Agnes Moorehead's makeover by Bud Westmore into the 105-year-old woman was the subject of magazine articles for months after release.

== Reception ==
=== Critical ===
The film was not well received by critics upon release, "written off as being rather gloomily literary." Bosley Crowther of The New York Times considered the film to be "little more than the average horror", believing that Robert Cummings and Susan Hayward had little chemistry, saying "Miss Hayward performs as the daft niece with a rigidity that is almost ludicrous, and Mr. Cummings has the unctuous manner of a nice young undertaker as the publisher. Eduardo Ciannelli is professional, at least, as a priest." Newsweek said: "Frankly, admirers of Henry James have cause for complaint, and the average moviegoer will probably complain of boredom." The New Republic said that "Robert Cummings gives a performance that is probably meant to be sensitive but turns out to be unctuous". The New York World Telegram called the film "ponderous, majestic and thoroughly dull".

The film has sometimes been seen in a more favorable light. Time Out said that the film is a "remarkably effective adaptation of Henry James' The Aspern Papers, closer to the shivery ambience of The Innocents than to the oh-so-discreet charm of Daisy Miller or The Europeans." David Thompson said that the film was "beautifully shot". Hayward's filmographer Eduardo Moreno felt that the subtle characterization of the baffling heroine was one of her finest performances.

=== Box Office ===
The film recorded a loss of $886,494.
