= Docteur Françoise Gailland =

1976 film directed by Jean-Louis Bertuccelli

- Theatrical release poster
- Directed by: Jean-Louis Bertuccelli
- Written by: Jean-Louis Bertuccelli; André G. Brunelin; Noëlle Loriot
- Produced by: Lise Fayolle; Yves Gasser; Yves Peyrot
- Starring: Annie Girardot
- Cinematography: Claude Renoir
- Edited by: Catherine Bernard; François Ceppi
- Music by: Catherine Lara
- Distributed by: Groupement des Editeurs de Films (GEF); Compagnie Commerciale Française Cinématographique (CCFC)
- Release date: 14 January 1976
- Running time: 100 minutes
- Country: France
- Language: French
- Box office: $19.8 million

Docteur Françoise Gailland is a 1976 French film directed by Jean-Louis Bertuccelli, and starring Annie Girardot, Jean-Pierre Cassel, François Périer and Isabelle Huppert. It won the César Award for Best Actress, and was nominated for Best Cinematography.

== Plot ==
Dr. Françoise Gailland has a hectic schedule, which causes her to have little time to spend with her family, which consists of her husband Gérard, her pregnant teenaged daughter Elisabeth, and her sullen son Julien. However, she does manage to find the time to spend with her lover, Daniel Letessier. While her life in such disarray, she learns that she has cancer. Françoise tries to put a brave face on it, and is determined to face the life-threatening disease with courage.

== Cast ==
- Annie Girardot as Françoise Gailland
- Jean-Pierre Cassel as Daniel Letessier
- François Périer as Gérard Gailland
- Isabelle Huppert as Élisabeth Gailland
- William Coryn as Julien Gailland
- Suzanne Flon as Geneviève Liénard
- Anouk Ferjac as Fabienne Cristelle
- Michel Subor as Régis Cabret
- Josephine Chaplin as Hélène Varèse
- André Falcon as Jean Rimevale
- Jacqueline Doyen as Raymonde
- Margo Lion as Mammy - la mère de Françoise
- Jacques Richard as Le docteur Lesoux
- Andrée Damant

== See also ==
- Isabelle Huppert on screen and stage
