= Merci la vie =

- Film poster
- Directed by: Bertrand Blier
- Written by: Bertrand Blier
- Produced by: Jean-Louis Livi
- Starring: Charlotte Gainsbourg; Anouk Grinberg; Michel Blanc; Jean Carmet; Annie Girardot; Catherine Jacob; Jean-Louis Trintignant; Thierry Frémont; Gérard Depardieu
- Cinematography: Philippe Rousselot
- Edited by: Claudine Merlin
- Distributed by: AMLF
- Release date: 13 March 1991
- Running time: 117 minutes
- Country: France
- Language: French
- Box office: $7.1 million

Merci la vie (English: "Thank You, Life") is a 1991 French film written and directed by Bertrand Blier. It won the César Award for Best Actor in a Supporting Role, and was nominated for Best Film, Best Actress, Best Supporting Actress, Best Director, Best Original Screenplay or Adaptation and Best Editing.

== Plot ==
Naive schoolgirl Camille Pelleveau meets the slightly older and more experienced Joëlle, a promiscuous woman who has just been thrown out of a car by her abusive boyfriend. Camille follows Joëlle as they go on a rampage where she discovers sex as they pick up men. Joëlle also shows Camille the darker side of life, as they start by crashing the men's cars and then decide to take on the whole town. However, medical researcher Dr. Marc Antoine Worms has invented a sexually transmitted disease and used Joëlle as a guinea pig by infecting her with it, so that he could become famous as the discoverer of its cure. Camille eventually learns about AIDS and fears she may have contracted the disease.

The story involves flashbacks, and in one sequence we learn that Camille's parents are feuding. Illogically, she tries to persuade them to reunite long enough for her conception to take place. The surreal plot and series of stylized scenes is in keeping with postmodern cinema, which challenges the notion of original creative thought.

== Cast ==
- Charlotte Gainsbourg as Camille Pelleveau
- Anouk Grinberg as Joëlle
- Michel Blanc as Raymond Pelleveau (Young Father)
- Jean Carmet as Raymond Pelleveau (Old Father)
- Annie Girardot as Evangéline Pelleveau (Old Mother)
- Catherine Jacob as Evangéline Pelleveau (Young Mother)
- Jean-Louis Trintignant as SS Officer
- Thierry Frémont as François
- Gérard Depardieu as Doctor Marc Antoine Worms
- François Perrot as Maurice
- Yves Rénier as Robert
- Jacques Boudet as Craven
- Laurent Gamelon as The Brother-in-Law
- Anouk Ferjac as Mother in clinic
- Didier Bénureau as Assistant Director
- Jean-Michel Dupuis as Lorry Driver
- Vincent Grass
