= List of Police Story episodes =

This is a list of episodes for the television series Police Story.

== Original series overview ==
Season	Episodes	Originally released	
Season	Episodes	First released	Last released
1	22	September 25, 1973	March 26, 1974
2	22	September 10, 1974	May 6, 1975
3	22	September 9, 1975	March 12, 1976
4	22	September 21, 1976	April 5, 1977
5	7	September 27, 1977	May 28, 1978

== Original series episodes ==
=== Season 1 (1973–74) ===
No. overall	No. in season	Title	Directed by	Written by	Runtime	Original release date
1	Pilot	"Slow Boy"	William A. Graham	E. Jack Neuman	120 min	March 20, 1973
2	1	"Dangerous Games"	John Badham	Robert L. Collins	60 min	October 2, 1973
3	2	"Requiem for an Informer"	Marvin Chomsky	Sy Salkowitz	60 min	October 9, 1973
4	3	"The Ten Year Honeymoon"	Marvin Chomsky	E. Arthur Kean	60 min	October 23, 1973
5	4	"The Violent Homecoming"	Virgil Vogel	Mark Rodgers	60 min	October 30, 1973
6	5	"The Ho Chi Minh Trail"	Richard Benedict	Michael Donovan	60 min	November 6, 1973
7	6	"Collision Course"	David Friedkin	Stanford Whitmore	60 min	November 20, 1973
8	7	"Death on Credit"	Edward M. Abroms	Sy Salkowitz	60 min	November 27, 1973
9	8	"The Big Walk"	Robert Day	Don Ingalls	60 min	December 4, 1973
10	9	"Man on a Rack"	John Llewellyn Moxey	Adrian Spies	60 min	December 11, 1973
11	10	"Line of Fire"	Barry Crane	E. Arthur Kean	60 min	December 18, 1973
12	11	"Chain of Command"	Leo Penn	S : David Friedkin; S/T : Morton Fine	60 min	January 8, 1974
13	12	"Countdown: Part 1"	Richard Benedict	Mark Rodgers	60 min	January 15, 1974
14	13	"Countdown: Part 2"	Richard Benedict	Mark Rodgers	60 min	January 22, 1974
15	14	"Cop in the Middle"	Gary Nelson	Sy Salkowitz	60 min	January 29, 1974
16	15	"The Ripper"	Gary Nelson	Don Ingalls	60 min	February 12, 1974
17	16	"Country Boy"	Barry Crane	Michael Donovan	60 min	February 19, 1974
18	17	"The Hunters" "Big John Morrison"	Richard Benedict	Sy Salkowitz	90 min	February 26, 1974
19	18	"Wyatt Earp Syndrome"	Robert L. Collins	Robert L. Collins	60 min	March 5, 1974
20	19	"Fingerprint"	Barry Crane	Sy Salkowitz	60 min	March 12, 1974
21	20	"Chief"	Virgil Vogel	Robert L. Collins	60 min	March 19, 1974
22	21	"The Gamble"	Richard Benedict	Robert L. Collins	60 min	March 26, 1974

=== Season 2 (1974–75) ===
No. overall	No. in season	Title	Directed by	Written by	Runtime	Original release date
23	1	"A Dangerous Age"	Virgil Vogel	E. Arthur Kean	60 min	September 10, 1974
24	2	"Requiem for C.Z. Smith"	Paul Krasny	Robert L. Collins	60 min	September 17, 1974
25	3	"Robbery: 48 Hours"	Virgil Vogel	Robert L. Collins	60 min	September 24, 1974
26	4	"Fathers and Sons"	Gary Nelson	Leonardo Bercovici	60 min	October 1, 1974
27	5	"World Full of Hurt"	Barry Crane	Sean Baine	60 min	October 8, 1974
28	6	"Glamour Boy"	Virgil Vogel	Sy Salkowitz	60 min	October 29, 1974
29	7	"Across the Line"	Nicholas Colasanto	Mark Rodgers & E. Jack Neuman	60 min	November 12, 1974
30	8	"Wolf"	Barry Shear	E. Arthur Kean	60 min	November 19, 1974
31	9	"Love, Mabel"	Robert L. Collins	S : Shel Willens; S/T : Jerrold L. Ludwig	60 min	November 26, 1974
32	10	"Explosion"	Alex March	Sy Salkowitz	60 min	December 3, 1974
33	11	"Captain Hook"	Richard Benedict	Frank Telford	60 min	December 17, 1974
34	12	"Incident in the Kill Zone"	Alexander Singer	E. Arthur Kean	60 min	January 7, 1975
35	13	"Headhunter"	Alexander Singer	Jerrold L. Ludwig	60 min	January 14, 1975
36	14	"Year of the Dragon: Part 1"	Virgil Vogel	Mark Rodgers	60 min	January 21, 1975
37	15	"Year of the Dragon: Part 2"	Virgil Vogel	Mark Rodgers	60 min	January 28, 1975
38	16	"To Steal a Million"	Barry Crane	Calvin Clements Jr.	60 min	February 4, 1975
39	17	"Sniper"	Alex March	Larry Brody & Sy Salkowitz	60 min	February 11, 1975
40	18	"The Execution"	Alexander Singer	Sean Baine	60 min	February 18, 1975
41	19	"The Man in the Shadows"	Richard Benedict	Jerrold L. Ludwig	60 min	February 25, 1975
42	20	"War Games"	Richard Benedict	David Moessinger	60 min	March 4, 1975
43	21	"The Witness"	Edward M. Abroms	Ken Pettus & Sy Salkowitz	60 min	March 11, 1975
44	22	"The Return of Joe Forrester"	Virgil Vogel	Mark Rodgers	90 min	May 6, 1975

=== Season 3 (1975–76) ===
No. overall	No. in season	Title	Directed by	Written by	Runtime	Original release date
45	1	"Officer Needs Help"	Paul Wendkos	Ed Waters	60 min	September 9, 1975
46	2	"The Cutting Edge"	Michael O'Herlihy	E. Arthur Kean	60 min	September 16, 1975
47	3	"A Community of Victims"	Robert L. Collins	Robert L. Collins	60 min	September 23, 1975
48	4	"Losing Game"	Alex March	Mark Rodgers	60 min	September 30, 1975
49	5	"The Cut Man Caper"	Don Medford	Larry Brody	120 min	October 28, 1975
50	6	"Face for a Shadow"	Alex March	Don Ingalls	60 min	November 7, 1975
51	7	"Test of Brotherhood"	Don Medford	Rick Kelbaugh	60 min	November 14, 1975
52	8	"The Empty Weapon"	Michael O'Herlihy	Sean Baine	60 min	November 21, 1975
53	9	"Little Boy Lost"	Alexander Singer	Jerrold L. Ludwig	60 min	November 28, 1975
54	10	"Vice: 24 Hours"	Lee H. Katzin	Don Ingalls	60 min	December 5, 1975
55	11	"Breaking Point"	Robert L. Collins	Robert L. Collins & Christian Wise	60 min	December 12, 1975
56	12	"Company Man"	Alexander Singer	Jerrold L. Ludwig	60 min	December 19, 1975
57	13	"Spanish Class"	Gary Nelson	Mark Rodgers	60 min	January 2, 1976
58	14	"Odyssey of Death: Part 1"	Don Medford	Harold Medford	60 min	January 9, 1976
59	15	"Odyssey of Death: Part 2"	Don Medford	Harold Medford	60 min	January 16, 1976
60	16	"The Other Side of the Fence"	Alexander Singer	S : Joshua Hanke; T : Tim Maschler	60 min	January 23, 1976
61	17	"50¢ First Half Hour, $1.75 All Day"	Barry Crane	Millard Kaufman	60 min	January 30, 1976
62	18	"Firebird"	Lee H. Katzin	E. Arthur Kean	60 min	February 6, 1976
63	19	"The Long Ball"	Alexander Singer	Eric Bercovici	60 min	February 13, 1976
64	20	"Eamon Kinsella Royce"	Tony Lo Bianco	Michael Mann	60 min	February 20, 1976
65	21	"Officer Dooly"	E. Arthur Kean	E. Arthur Kean	60 min	March 5, 1976
66	22	"Open City"	Barry Crane	Sean Baine	60 min	March 12, 1976

=== Season 4 (1976–77) ===
No. overall	No. in season	Title	Directed by	Written by	Runtime	Original release date
67	1	"Payment Deferred"	Corey Allen	Eric Bercovici & Leonardo Bercovici	60 min	September 21, 1976
68	2	"Bought and Paid For"	Alf Kjellin	Sean Baine	60 min	October 5, 1976
69	3	"Two Frogs on a Mongoose"	Bob Kelljan	Rick Kelbaugh	60 min	October 12, 1976
70	4	"The Other Side of the Badge"	Gary Nelson	Eric Bercovici	60 min	October 26, 1976
71	5	"Three Days to Thirty"	Barry Crane	Shel Willens	60 min	November 9, 1976
72	6	"Trash Detail, Front and Center"	Seymour Robbie	Rick Kelbaugh	60 min	November 16, 1976
73	7	"Thanksgiving"	Jerry London	Michael Mann	60 min	November 23, 1976
74	8	"Monster Manor"	Barry Shear	John Sacret Young	60 min	November 30, 1976
75	9	"Oxford Gray"	Vince Edwards	Kendelle J. Blair & David Korn	60 min	December 7, 1976
76	10	"The Jar: Part 1"	Michael O'Herlihy	Shel Willens	60 min	December 14, 1976
77	11	"The Jar: Part 2"	Michael O'Herlihy	Shel Willens	60 min	December 21, 1976
78	12	"Trial Board"	Corey Allen	Michael Mann	60 min	January 4, 1977
79	13	"Spitfire"	Seymour Robbie	Ed Waters	60 min	January 11, 1977
80	14	"Nightmare on a Sunday Morning"	Bob Kelljan	S : David Korn; T : Liam O'Brien & Ed Waters	60 min	January 18, 1977
81	15	"The Malflores"	Alexander Singer	John Sacret Young	60 min	January 25, 1977
82	16	"The Blue Fog"	Michael O'Herlihy	Shel Willens	60 min	February 1, 1977
83	17	"Hard Rock Brown"	Alf Kjellin	Michael Donovan	60 min	February 15, 1977
84	18	"End of the Line"	Michael O'Herlihy	Sean Baine	60 min	February 22, 1977
85	19	"One of Our Cops Is Crazy"	E. Arthur Kean	E. Arthur Kean	60 min	March 1, 1977
86	20	"Ice Time"	Robert Scheerer	John Sacret Young	60 min	March 8, 1977
87	21	"The Six Foot Stretch"	Michael O'Herlihy	E. Arthur Kean	60 min	March 24, 1977
88	22	"Prime Rib"	Don McDougall	Ed Waters	60 min	April 5, 1977

=== Season 5 (1977–78) ===
No. overall	No. in season	Title	Directed by	Written by	Runtime	Original release date
89	1	"Trigger Point"	Jerry London	Mark Rodgers	120 min	September 27, 1977
90	2	"Stigma"	Barry Shear	Rick Kelbaugh	120 min	November 9, 1977
91	3	"River of Promises"	Lee H. Katzin	Michael Mann	120 min	January 14, 1978
92	4	"Day of Terror... Night of Fear"	E. Arthur Kean	E. Arthur Kean	120 min	March 4, 1978
93	5	"The Broken Badge"	Lee H. Katzin	Adrian Leeds	120 min	March 19, 1978
94	6	"No Margin for Error"	Virgil Vogel	Mark Rodgers	120 min	April 30, 1978
95	7	"A Chance to Live"	Corey Allen	S : Richard Fielder; T : Larry Brody	120 min	May 28, 1978

=== Specials (1979–87) ===
No. overall	No. in season	Title	Directed by	Written by	Runtime	Original release date
96	1	"A Cry for Justice"	Bob Kelljan	Calvin Clements Jr.	120 min	May 23, 1979
97	2	"Confessions of a Lady Cop"	Lee H. Katzin	Mark Rodgers	120 min	April 28, 1980
98	3	"The Freeway Killings"	William A. Graham	Mark Rodgers	240 min	May 3, 1987

== Revival series overview ==
Season	Episodes	Originally released	
Season	Episodes	First released	Last released
1	5	October 29, 1988	December 3, 1988

== Revival series episodes ==
No.	Title	Directed by	Written by	Original release date	U.S. viewers (millions)	Rating/share (households)
R1	"The Cop Killers"	Larry Shaw	Rick Kelbaugh	October 29, 1988	13.7	9.0/16
Remake of "Stigma"
R2	"Gladiator School"	James Darren	Adrian Leeds	November 5, 1988	11.9	8.1/15
Remake of "The Broken Badge"
R3	"The Watch Commander"	Gary Nelson	Mark Rodgers	November 12, 1988	13.6	8.9/16
Remake of "Trigger Point"
R4	"Burnout"	Michael Switzer	Mark Rodgers	November 26, 1988	11.8	8.2/15
Remake of "Confessions of a Lady Cop"
R5	"Monster Manor"	Aaron Lipstadt	John Sacret Young	December 3, 1988	10.1	6.6/12
Remake of "Monster Manor"
