= The Ape Woman =

1964 film by Marco Ferreri

- Italian DVD cover
- Directed by: Marco Ferreri
- Written by: Rafael Azcona; Marco Ferreri
- Produced by: Carlo Ponti
- Starring: Ugo Tognazzi; Annie Girardot
- Cinematography: Aldo Tonti
- Edited by: Mario Serandrei
- Music by: Teo Usuelli
- Production companies: Compagnia Cinematografica Champion; Les Films Marceau Cocinor
- Release dates: 29 January 1964 (Italy); 24 June 1964 (France)
- Running time: 94 minutes (director's cut); 98 minutes (French version)
- Countries: Italy; France
- Languages: Italian; French

The Ape Woman (Italian: La donna scimmia, French: Le Mari de la femme à barbe) is a 1964 Italian-French satirical drama film directed by Marco Ferreri. The film was inspired by the real-life story of Julia Pastrana, a 19th-century woman who was exploited as a freak show attraction.

In 2008, the film was included in the Italian Ministry of Cultural Heritage's 100 Italian films to be saved, a list of 100 films that "have changed the collective memory of the country between 1942 and 1978."

== Plot ==
In a convent in Naples, entrepreneur Antonio Focaccia discovers Maria, who is completely covered with hair. He opens a business where he presents her as "the ape woman" whom he allegedly found in Africa. When he tries to sell her virginity to a professor, Maria resists and returns to the convent. To have her back, Antonio is forced to marry Maria at the convent's insistence.

After a successful audition in front of impresario Majeroni, the two are celebrated in night clubs in Paris, where Maria performs semi-nude. When Maria turns out to be pregnant, the examining doctor suggests an abortion as the baby might turn out a "monster". Maria rejects the possibility of an abortion and returns to Naples with Antonio to have her child. Both she and the child die shortly after the delivery, and their bodies are embalmed and presented at the museum of natural history. Antonio buys the bodies back from the museum and exhibits them in his own show.

== Cast ==
- Ugo Tognazzi as Antonio Focaccia
- Annie Girardot as Maria
- Achille Majeroni as Majeroni (credited as Achille Maieroni)
- Filippo Pompa Marcelli as Bruno
- Ermelinda De Felice as Sister Furgonicino (credited as Linda De Felice)
- Elvira Paolini as chambermaid
- Ugo Rossi as retiree
- Antonio Altoviti as professor

== Release ==
The Ape Woman was first screened in Bologna, Italy, on 29 January 1964 and, after being shown in competition at the 1964 Cannes Film Festival, released in French cinemas on 24 June 1964.

After its 4K restoration in 2017, the film was released on Blu-ray and digital platforms on 11 October 2021.

== Alternate endings ==
The Ape Woman exists in three different versions. In the version intended by Ferreri, Maria dies during childbirth, and the embalmed corpses of mother and child are presented by Antonio in public. This version was cut (either by the Italian censors or preventively by producer Ponti) before the Italian theatrical release, omitting the exhibition of the bodies. The longer French version adds an alternate ending, where Maria gives birth to a healthy child and loses her body hair, forcing Antonio to work at the docks to support his family.

According to the restored version's title card, the lighter French version played at the Cannes Film Festival, while the Cinémathèque Française states that Ferreri's darker original version was screened in Cannes, meeting with negative reactions. Jean de Baroncelli's review written for Le Monde during the Cannes Film Festival explicitly describes Maria's and the child's deaths and their posthumous presentation by Antonio, which corresponds with Ferreri's version.

Diverging statements also exist whether it was Italian producer Carlo Ponti who demanded an upbeat ending for the French release, or (as recalled by Annie Girardot) French co-producer Les Films Marceau Cocinor.

== Reception ==
In their 1964 articles for L'Espresso and Paese Sera, Alberto Moravia and Aldo Scagnetti criticised the decision to end the film with Maria's and her child's deaths and omit the presentation of their bodies for the Italian theatrical release. While Moravia argued that the story had lost its "logical conclusion", Scagnetti lamented that Ferreri's original ending had given "meaning to his apologue, or at least […] greater substance to its cruel bitterness".

According to Annie Girardot's biographer Pascal Mérigeau, The Ape Woman met almost unanimously with "contempt and disgust" by the French press. Jean de Baroncelli of Le Monde, reporting from the Cannes Film Festival, found the film "difficult to bear", lacking "prodigious comic force, an exceptional sense of the grotesque" and "extreme sensitivity" which the "unsavory subject" would have required. Upon the film's New York opening in September 1964 (where it was shown in the French version), Bosley Crowther of the New York Times found an "oddly distasteful film", with many scenes being "more painful than amusing, more horrid than humorous".

Reviewing the film for The Guardian upon its 2021 re-release, critic Peter Bradshaw saw a "broadly heartwarming, if strange cautionary tale of hubris, redemption and love", which gained "a new tenderness and complexity" by watching both Ferreri's and the French version side by side, comparing it, among others, with Freaks and La Strada.

== Awards ==
- 1965 Nastro d'Argento for best original subject

== See also ==
- Bearded lady
