= I Will Walk Like a Crazy Horse =

- Directed by: Fernando Arrabal
- Written by: Fernando Arrabal
- Produced by: Bernard Legargeant
- Starring: Emmanuelle Riva; George Shannon; Hachemi Marzouk; Marie France
- Cinematography: Bernard Auroux; Georges Barsky; Ramón F. Suárez; Alain Thiollet
- Edited by: Laurence Leininger
- Production companies: Babylone Films; Société Générale de Production
- Distributed by: Luso-France
- Release date: 22 November 1973 (France)
- Running time: 100 minutes
- Country: France
- Language: French

I Will Walk Like a Crazy Horse (French: J'irai comme un cheval fou, also known as I Will Go Like a Wild Horse) is a 1973 French surreal drama film directed by Fernando Arrabal. The film first released on 22 November 1973 in France and stars George Shannon as an epileptic man who, falsely suspected of murdering his mother, flees to the desert where he meets a hermit and brings him back to the city where the hermit becomes a circus performer.

Since its release the film has been shown at some film festivals such as the 2013 Psych Out film festival in Newcastle upon Tyne.

== Plot ==
After the death of his mother, the epileptic Aden Rey flees to the desert in order to avoid any police questioning, as they believe that he was responsible for his mother's death. It is there that Aden meets the savage yet noble Marvel, who can communicate with and control nature. After hanging out with Marvel, Aden decides to bring him back to civilization and show him the world. When they reach Pairs, Aden introduces Marvel to the modern marvels of the world, which does not impress Marvel.

In one scene, Marvel is tricked into joining the circus where he dances, and during one performance, he releases a lion from its cage into the audience. Meanwhile, Aden is experiencing flashbacks of his childhood, which reveals his mother to be a domineering, abusive woman who allowed him no contact with the outside world.

While the two men bond over their travels, Aden tries to convince Marvel that civilization is much more desirable than the wilderness, although Marvel appears to disagree. During all of this, the police continue their relentless pursuit of Aden.

== Cast ==
- Emmanuelle Riva as La mère (Madame Rey)
- George Shannon as Aden Rey
- Hachemi Marzouk as Marvel
- Marco Perrin as Oscar Tabak
- François Chatelet as Le prédicateur
- Marie-France as Bijou-Love (as Marie-France Garcia)
- Gerard Borlant as Le concierge
- Jean Chalon as Le maître d'hôtel
- Raoul Curet as Commissaire Falcon
- Luc Guérin as Aden enfant
- Antoine Marin as Le boucher
- Pedro Meca as Le 1er mangeur
- Gilles Meyer as Cascadeur
- Myriam Mézières as Dell
- Camilo Otero as Le 2ème mangeur

== Release and home media ==
The film first released on 22 November 1973 in France. In November 2005, a boxed-set titled "The Fernando Arrabal Collection" was released which contained the first three films from the filmmaker: Viva La Muerte, I Will Walk Like a Crazy Horse and The Guernica Tree. The boxed-set was limited to a run of 4,000 units.

== Reception ==
DVD Talk gave a mixed review, saying that the movie would appeal most to fans of surrealist cinema and that "Some of its graphic nature may have dulled over time, some not, and it is a bit heavy-handed, but it still holds up as an interesting work for those open to the distinctive surrealist storytelling style."

In their review of the film, Film Comment observed that the director "constructs an alter ego through which he stakes his claim as a provocative, subversive, and marginalized genius." The San Francisco Bay Guardian wrote the film is a "surreal yet strangely touching love story of sorts between an urban playboy on the run and the three-foot-tall male desert hermit." Author Nathaniel Thompson said the film is "visually slick and making admirable use of the striking desert locales, Arrabal's film is polished enough to pass for mainstream product even when it's strictly at odds with the content, which is still extreme enough to pack a punch."

Alexia Campbell wrote in La Palma that "in the countryside, Aden discovers natural beauty and encounters a hermit named Marvel; Aden develops an admiration for the hermit and his ability to communicate with animals, clouds, and the sun; but the paradise Aden finds is threatened when he clashes with civilization."

== See also ==
- List of LGBTQ-related films of 1973
