= The Architect and the Emperor of Assyria =

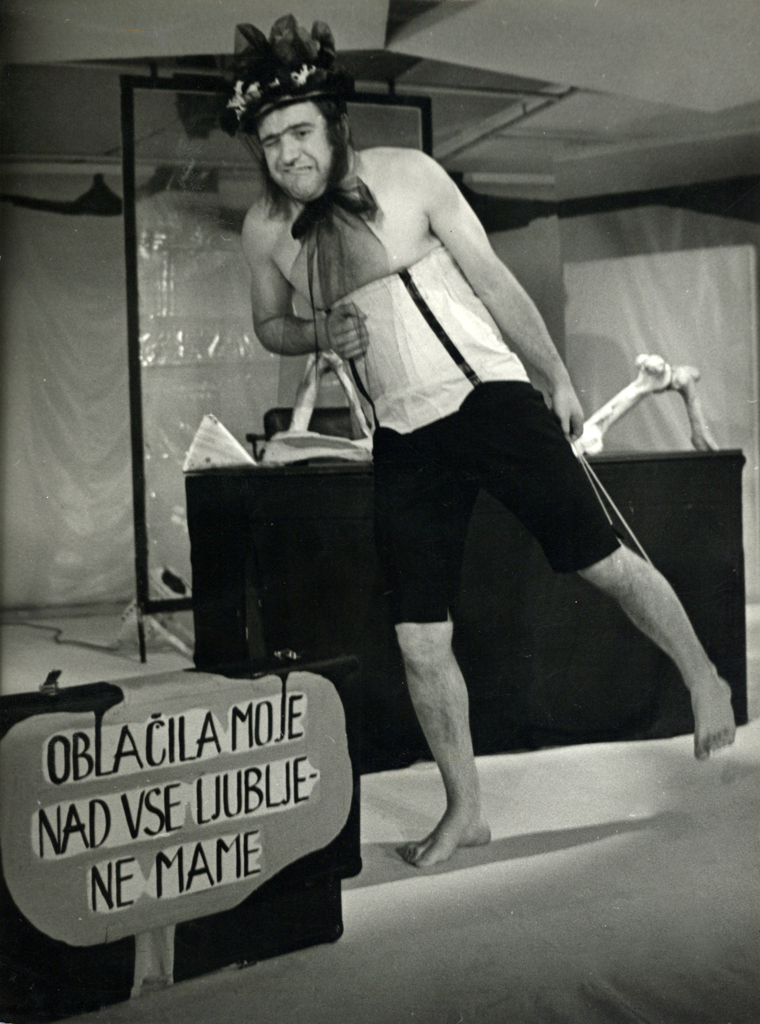
The play by the Ljubljana Drama Theatre in 1968

The Architect and the Emperor of Assyria (French: L'Architecte et l'Empereur d'Assyrie) is a 1967 play by Fernando Arrabal. It was produced by the Stratford Festival in 1970.
