= Sugar Cookies (film) =

- US film poster
- Directed by: Theodore Gershuny
- Screenplay by: Lloyd Kaufman; Theodore Gershuny
- Produced by: Ami Artzi
- Starring: George Shannon; Mary Woronov; Lynn Lowry; Monique van Vooren
- Cinematography: Hasse Wallin
- Edited by: Dov Hoenig
- Music by: Gershon Kingsley
- Production company: Armor Films
- Distributed by: General Film Corporation
- Release date: 1973
- Running time: 82 minutes
- Country: United States
- Language: English
- Budget: $100,000

Sugar Cookies (also known as Love Me My Way) is a 1973 American erotic crime thriller film directed by Theodore Gershuny.

It was co-written by future president of Troma Entertainment Lloyd Kaufman and produced by future director Oliver Stone.

== Plot ==
When an attractive young model (Lynn Lowry) is tricked into committing suicide on camera by her pornographer boyfriend, her lesbian partner (Mary Woronov) has a vengeful plan: with the help of an exact lookalike of her lover, she hatches a scheme to take down the sleazy drug dealer for good.

== Cast ==
- George Shannon - Max Pavell
- Mary Woronov - Camilla Stone
- Lynn Lowry - Alta Leigh / Julie Kent
- Monique van Vooren - Helene
- Maureen Byrnes - Dola
- Daniel Sadur - Gus
- Ondine - Roderick
- Jennifer Welles - Max's Secretary

== Production ==
Kaufman wrote the film in 1973 and, along with Theodore Gershuny and Ami Artzi, formed a film company called Armor Films in order to produce it. Kaufman was able to raise $100,000 himself and was set to direct, hiring friend Oliver Stone to associate produce. Before production, Kaufman decided to hand the position of director over to the more experienced Gershuny, who, in return, rewrote Kaufman's script and cast his then-wife Mary Woronov.
