= Story of a Woman =

1970 film by Leonardo Bercovici

- Storia di una donna
- Directed by: Leonardo Bercovici
- Written by: Leonardo Bercovici
- Produced by: Leonardo Bercovici
- Starring: Bibi Andersson; Robert Stack; James Farentino
- Cinematography: Piero Portalupi
- Edited by: Milton Shifman
- Music by: John Williams
- Color process: Technicolor
- Production company: Westward Films
- Distributed by: Universal Pictures
- Release date: February 13, 1970
- Running time: 90 minutes
- Countries: Italy; United States
- Languages: English; Swedish
- Budget: $1.4 million

Story of a Woman is a 1970 Italian-American drama romance film written, produced and directed by Leonardo Bercovici and starring Bibi Andersson, Robert Stack and James Farentino.

== Plot ==
A Swedish girl studying to be a concert pianist in Rome falls in love with a medical student. When she discovers the student is married to an older woman, she heads home to Sweden and marries an American diplomat. The diplomat is assigned to Rome.

== Cast ==
- Bibi Andersson as Karin Uilman
- Robert Stack as David Frasier
- James Farentino as Bruno Cardini
- Annie Girardot as Liliana
- Didi Perego as Bruno's Girl Friend
- Mario Nascimbene as Prof Ferrara
- Francesco Mulè as Manzetti (as Francesco Mulé)
- Frank Sundström as Mr. Ullman
- Toivo Pawlo as Rushenov
- Beppe Wolgers as Fahlen
- Birgitta Valberg as Mrs. Ullman
- Cathy Riney as Cathy
- Erika Rosell as Sissi

== Production ==
Universal wanted Robert Stack to sign to a long-term contract and star in the TV series The Name of the Game; as an inducement they offered him one feature film a year the first of which was Story of a Woman. He made it just before he started the series.

Stack called it "a love story, in the genre of A Man and a Woman with its own kind of style. The role is a real departure for me, my first unabashedly romantic story. When I saw daily footage I saw a character I'd never seen on film before – me."

James Farentino joined the cast in February 1968.

Filming began in March 1968 in Stockholm. It was also filmed in Rome.

Composer John Williams contributed to the film's score with the song "Uno di qua, l'altra di là", which was sung by Onella Vanoni.

== Reception ==
The film's release was delayed a long time. According to one report the film "played a week in Cleveland and died." It screened in Los Angeles in late 1971, the Los Angeles Times calling it "well made". The Motion Picture Herald also reviewed the film, noting that it was "straight out of the pages of one of the better women's magazines". Variety predicted its "clichéd development will have very limited appeal."

Stack later wrote "despite good reviews, the film came in over budget and didn't make a nickel." Stack says that Universal tried to get out of its commitment to him to make one film a year for the next two years - they ended up paying him off.

== See also ==
- List of American films of 1970
