= Anouk Ferjac =

French actress (born 1932)

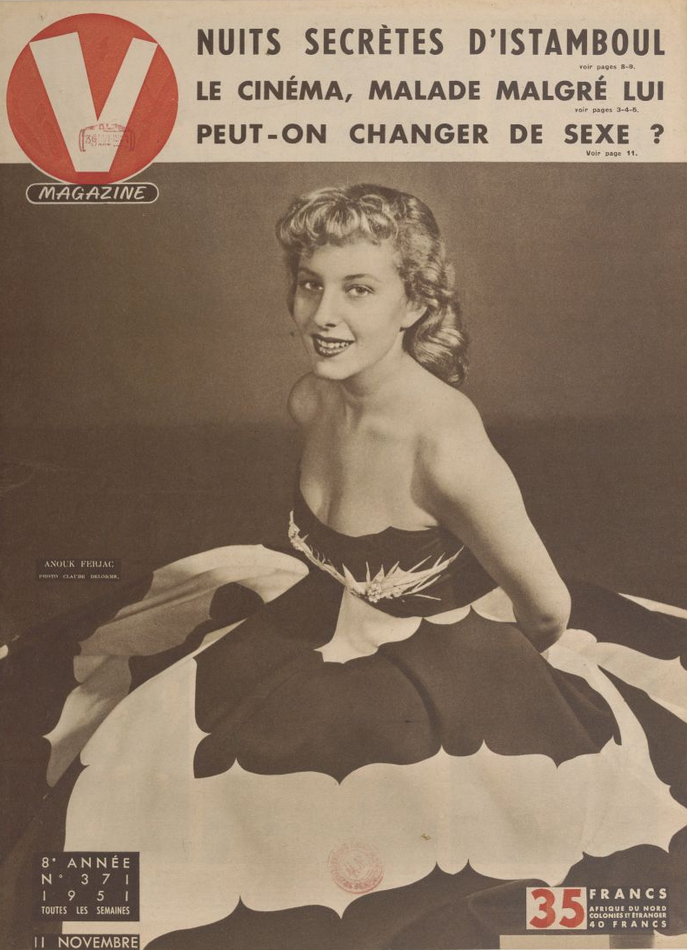
- Ferjac in 1951
- Born: 25 May 1932 (age 94); Paris, France
- Occupation: Actress
- Years active: 1946–2000

Anouk Ferjac (born 25 May 1932) is a French actress. She has appeared in 100 films and television shows between 1946 and 2000.

== Selected filmography ==
- City of Hope (1948)
- Scandal on the Champs-Élysées (1949)
- Justice Is Done (1950)
- Without Trumpet or Drum (1950)
- Nightclub (1951)
- Adam Is Eve (1954)
- La Traversée de Paris (1956)
- Live for Life (1967)
- Je t'aime, je t'aime (1968)
- This Man Must Die (1969)
- Viva la muerte (1971)
- Le Drakkar (1973)
- Piaf (1974)
- The Garden That Tilts (1974)
- Docteur Françoise Gailland (1976)
- Little Marcel (1976)
- Peppermint Soda (1977)
- Liberty Belle (1983)
- Lien de parenté (1986)
- Merci la vie (1991)
