= Police Story (1973 TV series) =

American crime drama television series (1973–1987)

- Official DVD cover
- Genre: Police procedural Anthology
- Created by: Joseph Wambaugh
- Opening theme: Jerry Goldsmith
- Country of origin: United States
- No. of seasons: 5
- No. of episodes: 98 (list of episodes)

Production
- Executive producer: David Gerber
- Running time: 60 min.
- Production companies: David Gerber Productions; Screen Gems (1973–1974); Columbia Pictures Television (1974–1978, 1979, 1980, 1987)

Original release
- Network: NBC
- Release: September 25, 1973 – May 3, 1987

Related
- Police Woman; Joe Forrester; David Cassidy: Man Undercover

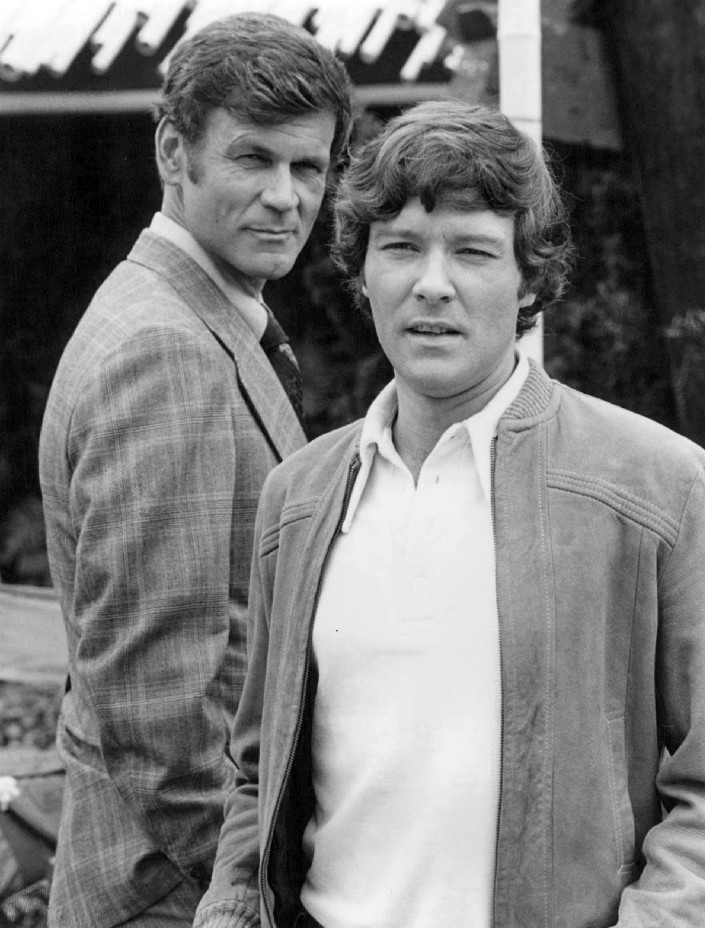
Don Murray and Michael Anderson Jr. in an episode of Police Story (1975).

Police Story is an American anthology crime drama television series that aired weekly on NBC from September 25, 1973, through April 5, 1977, followed by a season of irregularly scheduled television film specials from September 27, 1977, to May 28, 1978, with three further television films screened in 1979, 1980, and 1987. The show was created by author and former police officer Joseph Wambaugh and was described by The Complete Directory of Prime Time Network and Cable TV Shows as "one of the more realistic police series to be seen on television". It was produced by David Gerber and Mel Swope.

== Overview ==
Although it was an anthology, all episodes had certain things in common; for instance, the main character in each episode was always a police officer. The setting was always Los Angeles, and the characters always worked for some branch of the Los Angeles Police Department. Notwithstanding the anthology format, some characters were recurring. During the first three seasons, Scott Brady appeared in 16 episodes as "Vinnie", a retired cop, who had opened a bar catering to police officers, and who acted as a sort of Greek chorus during the run of the series, commenting on the characters and plots. Others who appeared more than once were Tony Lo Bianco and Don Meredith, each making five appearances as Robbery-Homicide Division partners Tony Calabrese and Bert Jameson, four of these appearances being in the same episodes; Vic Morrow played surveillance specialist Joe LaFrieda in the pilot, "Slow Boy", and in the first-season, two-part episode, "Countdown". Vice officer turned homicide detective Charlie Czonka was played by James Farentino in two episodes, and John Bennett Perry played Officer Chick Torpey five times during the first two seasons, including the pilot film. Chuck Connors and Jackie Cooper also starred in various episodes, as different characters on both sides of the law.

The anthology format allowed the series to depict a wider variety of police activities and experiences than was usual in police dramas. In addition to detectives investigating major crimes, or patrol officers patrolling high-crime beats, the show depicted newly hired cadets trying to make it through the academy, woman officers trying to fit into a male-dominated profession, traffic officers investigating accidents, officers dealing with marital difficulties or alcohol dependence, fingerprint technicians trying to develop suspects from a single print, high-ranking administrators dealing with the stresses of command in a major metropolitan police force, officers adjusting to permanent physical disabilities caused by on-duty injuries, and officers trying to juggle two different jobs to make enough money to make an adequate living.

The anthology format also allowed the show to try out characters and settings for series development, and during its broadcast run, Police Story generated three spin-offs. A first-season episode, "The Gamble", starring Angie Dickinson, became the pilot for the successful Police Woman, which ran from 1974 to 1978. "The Return of Joe Forrester", a second-season episode starring Lloyd Bridges, was developed into the weekly series Joe Forrester, which lasted a full season. Finally, "A Chance to Live", a special episode from the fifth season starring David Cassidy, was spun off into the series Man Undercover. That series did not do as well, and lasted only 10 episodes.

In later seasons, perhaps because of the expense of maintaining the anthology format on a weekly basis, Police Story became a series of irregularly scheduled television films.

Police Story was a precursor to later shows such as NBC's Hill Street Blues (1981–1987), NBC's and CBS's In the Heat of the Night (1988–95), Law & Order (1990–2010), ABC's NYPD Blue (1993–2005), NBC's Homicide: Life on the Street (1993–1999) and FX's The Shield (2002–2008).

== Guest stars ==
Numerous actors, musicians, sports figures, radio personalities and former real-life cops, who were familiar to audiences in the 1960s and 1970s, made appearances on the series, including:

- Claude Akins
- Edward Albert
- Robert Alda
- John Amos
- Loni Anderson
- Tige Andrews
- Michael Ansara
- Pedro Armendariz Jr.
- Desi Arnaz Jr.
- Elizabeth Ashley
- Ed Asner
- John Astin
- Frankie Avalon
- Jim Backus
- Diane Baker
- Kaye Ballard
- Martin Balsam
- Sandy Baron
- Noah Beery Jr.
- Edgar Bergen
- Carl Betz
- Joan Blondell
- Danny Bonaduce
- Lloyd Bridges
- Jim Brown
- Robert Brown
- Dick Butkus
- Edd Byrnes
- Godfrey Cambridge
- Joseph Campanella
- Jack Carter
- David Cassidy
- Dennis Cole
- Michael Cole
- Dabney Coleman
- Gary Collins
- Chuck Connors
- Mike Connors
- Michael Conrad
- Bert Convy
- Jackie Cooper
- James Cromwell
- Brandon Cruz
- Robert Culp
- Cesare Danova
- Kim Darby
- James Darren
- Clifton Davis
- Lynda Day George
- Angie Dickinson
- Kevin Dobson
- David Doyle
- Howard Duff
- Patty Duke
- Vince Edwards
- Eddie Egan
- Richard Egan
- Chad Everett
- Shelley Fabares
- Antonio Fargas
- Norman Fell
- Mel Ferrer
- Glenn Ford
- Robert Forster
- John Forsythe
- Joe Garagiola
- Christopher George
- Louis Gossett Jr.
- Harold Gould
- Robert Goulet
- David Groh
- Clu Gulager
- Larry Hagman
- Bernie Hamilton
- George Hamilton
- Earl Holliman
- Rodolfo Hoyos Jr.
- Robert Ito
- David Janssen
- Russell Johnson
- Don Johnson
- Gordon Jump
- Gabe Kaplan
- Lenore Kasdorf
- Casey Kasem
- Celia Kaye
- Sally Kirkland
- Cheryl Ladd
- Hope Lange
- Steve Lawrence
- Michael Learned
- Jerry Lee Lewis
- Cleavon Little
- Tony Lo Bianco
- Gary Lockwood
- Tina Louise
- John Lupton
- Robert Mandan
- George Maharis
- Darren McGavin
- Donna Mills
- Martin Milner
- Sal Mineo
- Cameron Mitchell
- Ricardo Montalbán
- Vic Morrow
- Diana Muldaur
- Don Murray
- Tony Musante
- France Nuyen
- Hugh O'Brian
- Donald O'Connor
- Freda Payne
- Joanna Pettet
- Paul Picerni
- Della Reese
- Pernell Roberts
- Smokey Robinson
- Alex Rocco
- John Russell
- Kurt Russell
- Albert Salmi
- Joe Santos
- John Saxon
- William Schallert
- Martha Scott
- William Shatner
- Gregory Sierra
- Dean Smith
- Robert Stack
- Sylvester Stallone
- Laraine Stephens
- Stella Stevens
- Dean Stockwell
- Rufus Thomas
- Jan-Michael Vincent
- Gary Vinson
- John Vivyan
- Robert Walden
- Dennis Weaver
- Stuart Whitman
- Larry Wilcox
- Cindy Williams
- Fred Williamson
- Lana Wood
- James Woods

== Episodes ==
Season	Episodes	Originally aired	
Season	Episodes	First aired	Last aired
1	22	September 25, 1973	March 26, 1974
2	22	September 10, 1974	May 6, 1975
3	22	September 9, 1975	March 12, 1976
4	22	September 21, 1976	April 5, 1977
5	8	September 27, 1977	May 23, 1979
Specials	3	May 23, 1979	May 3, 1987

== Awards and nominations ==
Two episodes received an Edgar Award from the Mystery Writers of America for Best Episode in a Television Series: "Requiem for an Informer", written by Sy Salkowitz (from the first season), and "Requiem for C.Z. Smith" by Robert L. Collins (second season). In 1976, the show won the Primetime Emmy Award for Outstanding Drama Series; it was also among the shows nominated for that award in 1974, 1975, and 1977.

== Home media ==
Shout! Factory (under license from Sony Pictures Home Entertainment) has released the first three seasons of Police Story on DVD in Region 1.

DVD name	Ep #	Release date
Season one	22	September 6, 2011
Season two	22	August 15, 2017
Season three	22	August 21, 2018

== The 1988 revival ==
Police Story
- Genre: Police procedural
- Opening theme: Dennis McCarthy
- Country of origin: United States
- No. of seasons: 1
- No. of episodes: 5 (list of episodes)

Production
- Executive producer: Clyde Phillips
- Cinematography: Neil Roach
- Editor: Russell Denove
- Production company: Columbia Pictures Television

Original release
- Network: ABC
- Release: October 29 – December 3, 1988

From October 29 to December 3, 1988, ABC aired five Police Story TV films using scripts from the original run to fill in for the ABC Mystery Movie, then delayed by the writers' strike. The stars of the films included Ken Olin, Robert Conrad, and Jack Warden. Lindsay Wagner also starred in an episode titled "Burnout".

=== Episodes ===
Season	Episodes	Originally aired	
Season	Episodes	First aired	Last aired
1	5	October 29, 1988	December 3, 1988
