= Núria Espert =

Spanish actor and director

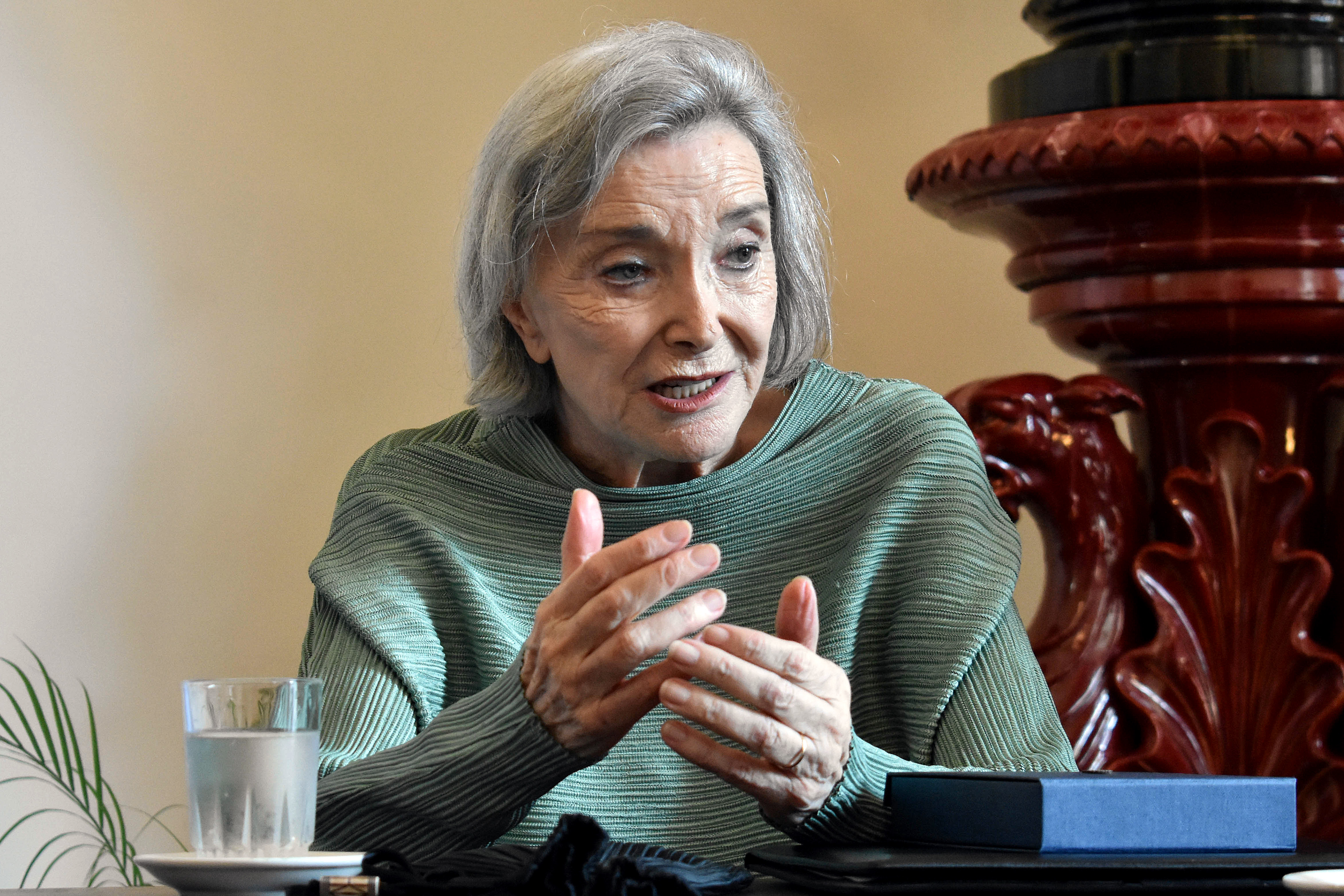
- Espert in 2019
- Born: Núria Espert Romero; 11 June 1935 (age 89); L'Hospitalet de Llobregat (Barcelona), Spain
- Occupation(s): actor and director

Núria Espert Romero (born 11 June 1935 in L'Hospitalet de Llobregat, Catalonia, Spain) is a Spanish theatre and television actor, and theatre and opera director.

When she was 19 years old, she married the actor Armando Moreno, who would later become her manager.

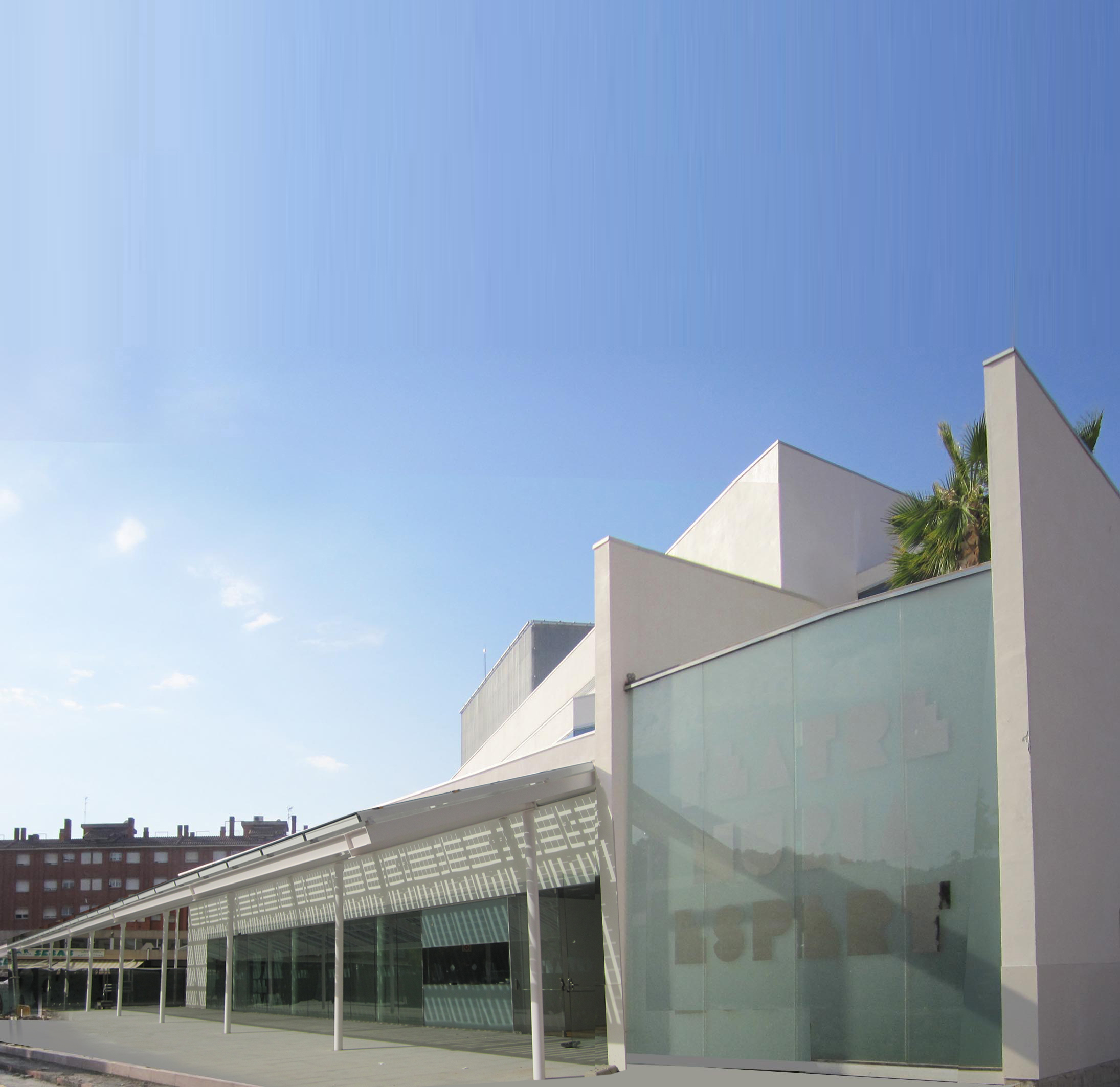
Teatre Núria Espert, Sant Andreu de la Barca, Barcelona

As a tribute to this actor, the city of Fuenlabrada named a theatre "Sala Municipal de Teatro Núria Espert".

== Professional trajectory ==
Núria Espert studied high school at the Maragall Institute in Barcelona and later completed her studies with music and Languages. At only sixteen years of age, she began to work in amateur theatre and in the 1950s she had the opportunity to perform, in her native Barcelona, great classics such as La vida es sueño (Life is a Dream) (1950) and El jardinero de Falerina (The Gardener of Falerina) (1953), by Calderón de la Barca; Los empeños de una casa (1952), by Sor Juana Inés de la Cruz; or Romeo and Juliet (1953), by Shakespeare, adapted into Catalan by Josep Maria de Sagarra. In this language she interpreted numerous works, such as El marit vé de visita (1951).

Her big break came in 1954, when she replaced actor Elvira Noriega in Medea. The triumph she achieved through her performance at the Teatre Grec in Barcelona was decisive for her to dedicate herself to acting in a professional manner. During the following years, and as part of the Lope de Vega Company directed by José Tamayo, she consolidated her position as one of the figures on the Catalan and Spanish scenes. In this line, she obtained success in plays like El caballero de Olmedo (1954), by Lope de Vega; La muralla (1955), by Joaquín Calvo Sotelo; Julio César (1955), by William Shakespeare, together with Mary Carrillo; Las brujas de Salem (1957), by Arthur Miller; or; Don Juan Tenorio (1958), by Zorrilla, together with Luis Prendes.

In 1959, she created her own theater company and, shortly after, she premiered Gigí at the Recoletos Theater in Madrid and Eugene O'Neill's play, Anna Christie.

== Europe Theatre Prize ==
In 2018, she was awarded a Special Prize of the XVII Europe Theatre Prize, in Saint Petersburg. The Prize organization stated:

It is not at all common that the growth of an extraordinary artistic talent should coincide with the development of parallel human qualities. Since her birth in 1935, Núria Espert is that rare example of a tireless, sensitive and empathetic actress who, from the start of an acting career at barely 13 years old that grew side by side with a life of cultural passions, civil and political engagement, has become an icon of the Twentieth Century and contemporary life. Woman of the theatre, still fully active today, she has journeyed from the classics (she has several times played an unforgettable Medea) to Garcia Lorca, plunged into the most contemporary theatre, auteur cinema, and directing in film and theatre, not forgetting some important work in directing opera. Peter Brook likened her to ‘a glass of water that can freeze and boil at the same time’. For his part, Terenci Moix claims she is made of ‘air and fire’. It is no surprise that the unforgettable José Monleón, who valued her highly and once put her in touch with Jerzy Grotowski, allowing her to discover his theatre, should have put her name forward several times in the world of European theatre. Núria Espert is not only a fantastic theatre animal, difficult to cage: she is truly a free spirit, creative, multi-faceted, unpredictable, passionate and soaring. Now, this year, the Special Prize is added to the many awards she has received in her long career, to recall her genius, ductility and civil engagement, transmitted through an art that fully represents the ideal of a Europe that is united, open, democratic and culturally active.

== Prizes and Awards ==
- 1984 Premio Nacional de Teatro
- 2016 Premio Princesa de Asturias de las Artes
- 2018 Europe Theatre Prize - Special Prize
- 2024 The Royal Central School of Speech and Drama - awarded the Degree of Doctor of Literature

== Filmography ==
- 1954: Once pares de botas
- 1958: La tirana
- 1961: A las cinco de la tarde
- 1971: Viva la muerte
- 1976: La ciutat cremada
- 1991: The House of Bernarda Alba
- 1996: actors
- 2003: Soneto
- 2007: Barcelona (un mapa)

== Theatre ==
- 1969: The Maids
- 1973: Yerma
- 1981: Doña Rosita la soltera
- 1981: Medea
- 1983: The Tempest
- 1985: Salome
- 1990: Maquillaje
- 1998: Master Class
- 1999: Who's Afraid of Virginia Woolf?
- 2003: La Celestina
- 2006: Play Strindberg
- 2007: Hay que purgar a Totó
- 2009: La casa de Bernarda Alba

== Opera ==
- 1987: Madama Butterfly, Giacomo Puccini.
- 1988: Rigoletto, Giuseppe Verdi.
- 1988: Elektra, Richard Strauss.
- 1989: La Traviata, Giuseppe Verdi.
- 1991: Carmen, Georges Bizet.
- 1995: Stiffelio, Giuseppe Verdi.
- 1999: Turandot, Giacomo Puccini.
- 2004: Tosca, Giacomo Puccini.
- 2012: Ainadamar, Osvaldo Golijov.
