= George Shannon (actor) =

American gerentologist and actor (1939–2003)

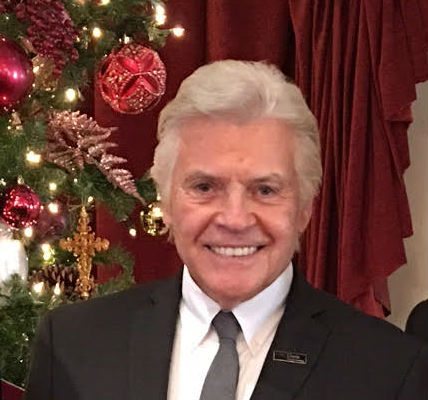
George Shannon, professor and former television and film actor.

George Raymond Shannon (December 30, 1939 – March 1, 2023) was an American professor of gerontology at the USC Leonard Davis School of Gerontology, inaugural holder of the Kevin Xu Chair in Gerontology, and director of the Rongxiang Xu Regenerative Life Science Laboratory. He was also a television and film actor, particularly known for his appearances in soap operas, including How to Survive a Marriage, Search for Tomorrow, Generations, and General Hospital. He played a leading role in the French surreal drama film I Will Walk Like a Crazy Horse, as well as starring in the X-rated film, Sugar Cookies—both from 1973.

In 1995, Shannon returned to college to pursue a Bachelor's, Master's, and PhD in gerontology after a nearly 30-year career in acting.

== Career ==
=== Actor ===
Shannon studied improvisational acting for two years at The Second City in Chicago and studied with Lee Strasberg in his private classes and at the Actors Studio for seven years. He has performed in over 50 plays, six films, and has had contract roles on five daytime series. He also served as a teacher of improvisation and theatre director in Los Angeles.

=== Professor ===
Shannon taught courses in Program Evaluation, Social Policy and Aging, and Society and Adult Development. His later research work was focused on Multicultural Aging and Creative Arts. He authored or co-authored seven peer-reviewed articles professional journals. He was an active member of Phi Kappa Phi and the Sigma Phi Omega Gerontology Honor Society.

== Death ==
Shannon died on March 1, 2023, at the age of 83.
