= Viva la Muerte (film) =

1971 drama film directed by Fernando Arrabal

Viva la muerte
- Directed by: Fernando Arrabal
- Written by: Fernando Arrabal
- Produced by: Hassen Daldoul; Jean Velter
- Starring: Mahdi Chaouch; Anouk Ferjac; Núria Espert
- Cinematography: Jean-Marc Ripert
- Edited by: Laurence Leininger
- Production companies: Isabelle Films; SATPEC
- Distributed by: Alliance Releasing Corporation
- Release date: 12 May 1971
- Countries: France; Algeria; Morocco; Spain; Portugal; Philippines; Brazil; Italy
- Languages: French; Italian; Spanish; Portuguese; Arabic; Filipino; Tagalog; Cebuano; Berber

Viva la Muerte (English: Long Live Death) is a 1971 internationally produced drama film shot in Algeria, France, Spain, Italy, Portugal, Brazil, Philippines, Morocco and Tunisia and directed by Fernando Arrabal. The film was released on 12 May 1971 and Arrabal drew on his own childhood for inspiration for the movie. Viva la Muerte takes place at the end of the Spanish Civil War, telling the story of Fando, a young boy whose father was turned in to authorities as a suspected communist by his Falange-sympathizing mother. It has gained cult popularity as a midnight movie. The opening credits sequence features drawings by artist, actor and novelist Roland Topor.

== Synopsis ==
When Fando's fascist-sympathizing mother turns his father in to the authorities as a suspected communist, Fando (Mahdi Chaouch) is told that his father was executed. In truth, the father is actually just imprisoned and Fando eventually begins to search for him, constantly imagining what his father might be up to or what might have happened to him.

== Cast ==
- Anouk Ferjac as La Tante
- Núria Espert as La Mère
- Mahdi Chaouch as Fando
- Ivan Henriques as Le Père
- Jazia Klibi as Thérèse
- Suzanne Comte as La Grand-mère
- Jean-Louis Chassigneux as Le Grand-père
- Mohamed Bellasoued as Colonel
- Víctor García as Fando - 20 ans

== Reception ==
Allmovie gave Viva la Muerte four stars, remarking that the film's extreme visuals would make it "not for the faint of heart". The New York Times gave the film a mostly positive review, stating that while it was "no perfect movie, it seems to me inescapably a major work."
