= Jean Cortot =

French painter, poet and illustrator

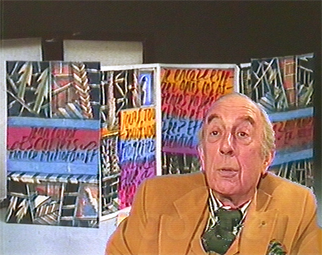
Jean Cortot (screenshot of a video from the audiovisual Encyclopedia of Contemporary Art)

Jean Cortot (English: /kɔːrˈtoʊ/ kor-TOH, French: [ʒɑ̃ kɔʁto]; 14 February 1925 – 28 December 2018) was a French painter, poet and illustrator, known particularly for his exploration of the links between painting and writing.

== Biography ==
Cortot was born in Alexandria, Egypt, the son of the pianist Alfred Cortot. A student of Othon Friesz, Corton was part of the Scale group which he established with Jacques Busse, Calmettes, Patrix, Geneviève Asse and others. In 1948 Cortot was awarded the "Prix de la Jeune Peinture". Working initially on figurative landscapes, notable works included his studies in the shipyard of La Ciotat (1947–1950), the landscape of the Ardèche, Still Life (1955–1956), variations on his Cities Series (1957–1958), his Antiques (1962) and his Combat Series (1967). In his later career Cortot explored links between painting and writing. A biography published by the Diane de Polignac Gallery records: "Cortot covered his painted works with philosophical and poetic texts. From the 1980s onwards, [his] work evolved into 'painted script' that paid tribute to the writers he admired." Cortot described himself as a "text predator". The Fondation Maeght, which holds examples of his work, notes that, as his approach developed; "his paintings included words, then quotes, before being filled with whole poems."

Cortot was elected member of the French Academy of Fine Arts on 26 November 2001. He died in Paris in 2018. A major collection of his work is held at the Centre Pompidou. (Note: Over 100 of Cortot's paintings were lost in a warehouse fire in Paris in the 1990s.)

== Significance ==
Cuban art critic Severo Sarduy has said of Cortot, in the introduction to his Inscription and intention: "While the conceptual history of writing in the West is vast, its graphic history remains extremely poor. The concern for elegance in the stroke, for the projection of the line, for curves and flourishes, we assigned to the civilizations of ideograms and arabesques, leaving our script with a purely informative role, a role devoid of ornament, script reduced to its austere legibility .... and it is precisely in its contradiction thereof that Jean Cortot's work derived its singularity."
