= Antonio Damasio =

Portuguese neuroscientist (born 1944)

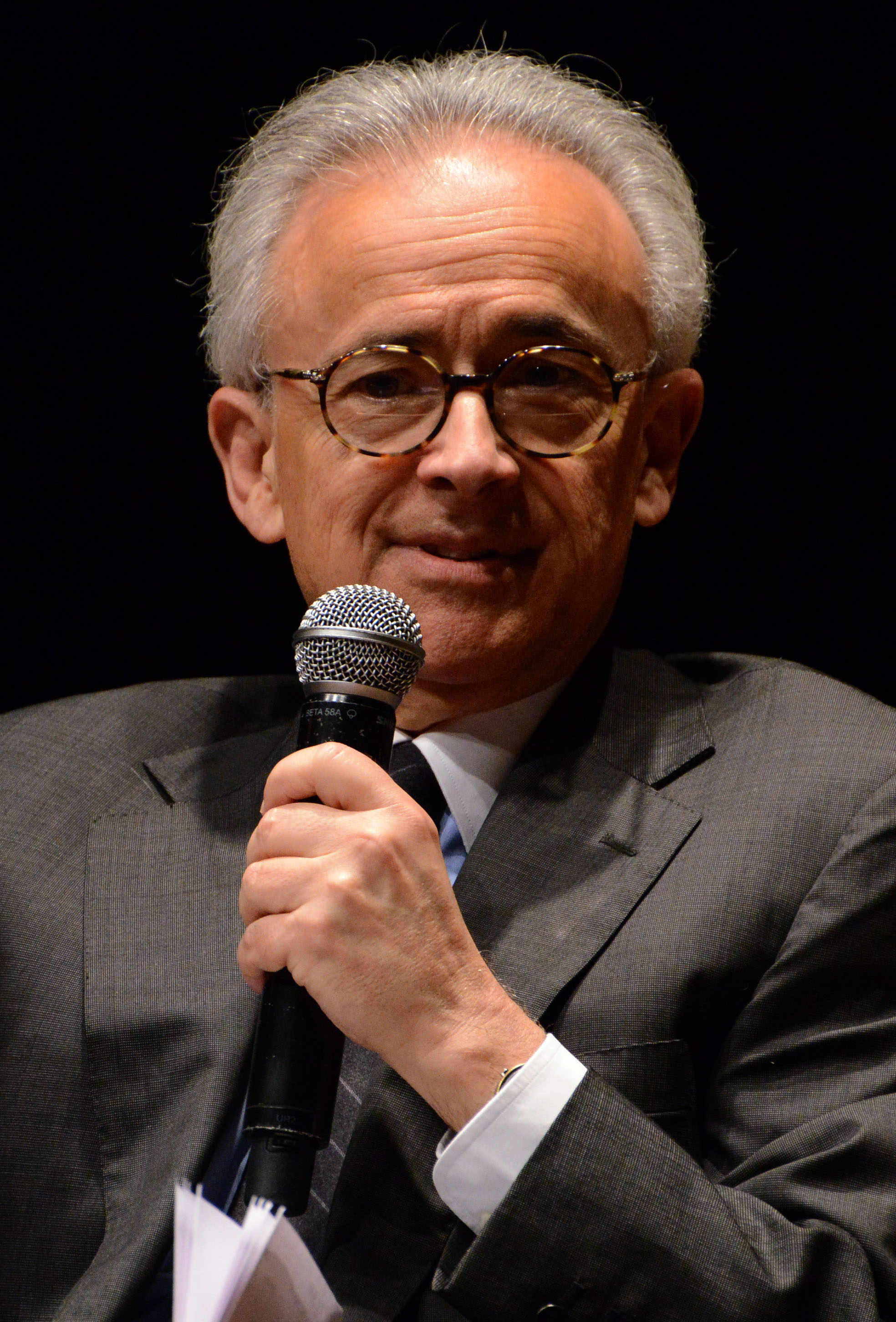
- Damasio at the Fronteiras do Pensamento conference in 2013
- Born: António Damásio; 25 February 1944 (age 82); Lisbon, Portugal
- Education: University of Lisbon
- Spouse: Hanna Damasio
- Awards: Pessoa Prize (1992); Golden Brain Award (1995); Prince of Asturias Prize (2005); Honda Prize (2010); Grawemeyer Award in Psychology (2014); Paul D. MacLean Award (2019)
- Scientific career
- Fields: Cognitive neuroscience
- Workplaces: University of Southern California, University of Iowa
- Thesis: Perturbações neurológicas da linguagem e de outras funções simbólicas (1974)
- Academic advisors: Norman Geschwind

Councilor of State
- In office 24 April 2017 – 14 February 2024
- President: Marcelo Rebelo de Sousa
- Preceded by: António Guterres
- Succeeded by: Joana Carneiro

Antonio Damasio (Portuguese: António Damásio; born 25 February 1944) is a Portuguese neuroscientist. He is currently the David Dornsife Chair in Neuroscience, as well as Professor of Psychology, Philosophy, and Neurology, at the University of Southern California, and, additionally, an adjunct professor at the Salk Institute. He was previously the chair of neurology at the University of Iowa for 20 years. Damasio heads the Brain and Creativity Institute, and has authored several books. One of the most renowned neuroscientists of his generation, Damasio's research in neuroscience has shown that emotions play a central role in social cognition and decision-making.

== Life and work ==
During the 1960s, "Damasio studied medicine at the University of Lisbon Medical School, where he also did his neurological residency and completed his doctorate in 1974." "For part of his studies, he researched behavioral neurology under the supervision of Norman Geschwind of the Aphasia Research Center in Boston."

Damasio's main field is neurobiology, especially the neural systems which underlie emotion, decision-making, memory, language and consciousness.

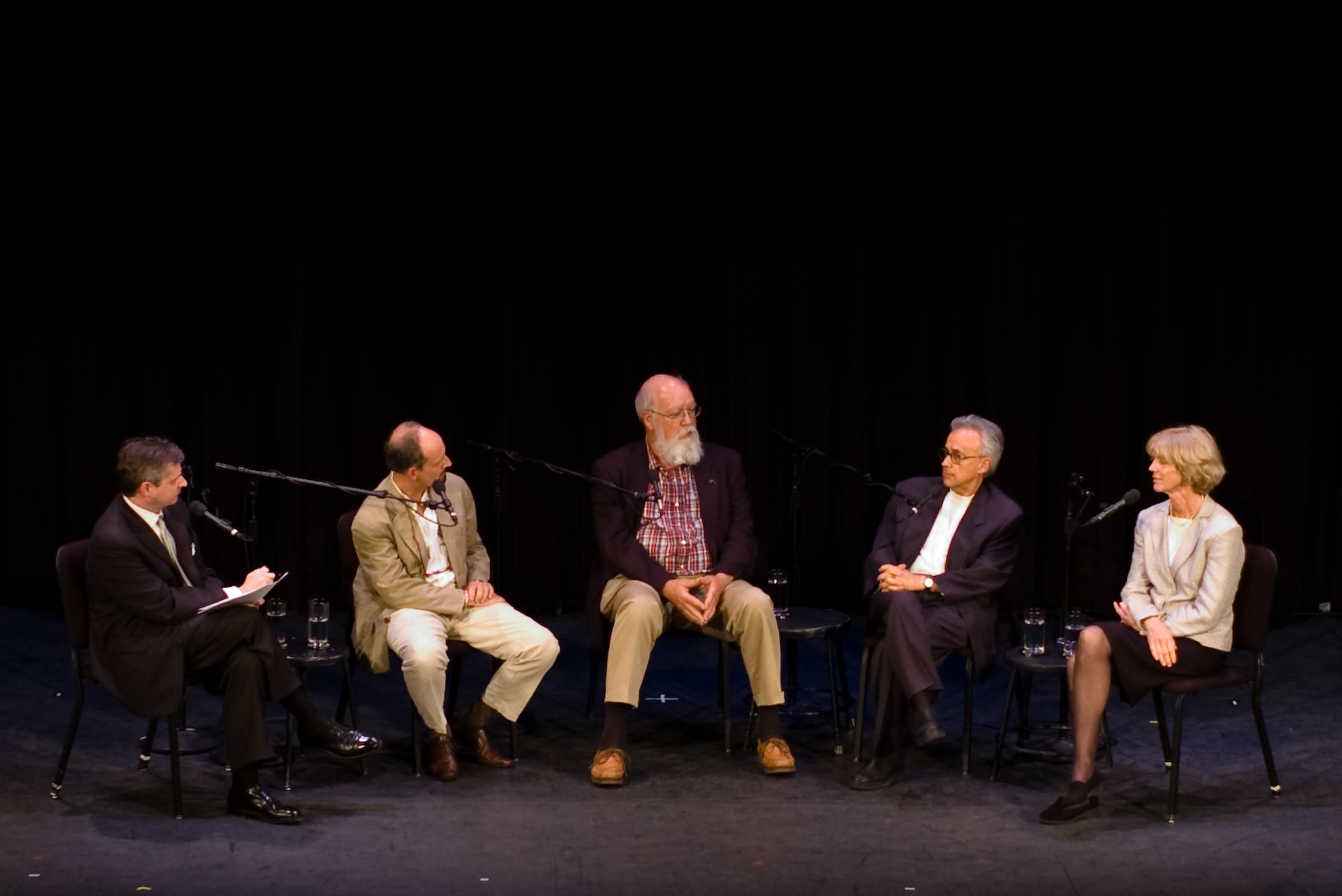
Damasio in 2008 (2nd from right)

Damasio formulated the somatic marker hypothesis, a theory about how emotions and their biological underpinnings are involved in decision-making (both positively and negatively, and often non-consciously). According to the theory, emotions provide the scaffolding for the construction of social cognition and are required for the self processes which undergird consciousness. "Damasio provides a contemporary scientific validation of the linkage between feelings and the body by highlighting the connection between mind and nerve cells ... this personalized embodiment of mind."

The somatic marker hypothesis has inspired many neuroscience experiments carried out in laboratories in the U.S. and Europe, and has had a major impact in contemporary science and philosophy. Damasio has been named by the Institute for Scientific Information as one of the most highly cited researchers in the past decade. Current work on the biology of moral decisions, neuro-economics, social communication, and drug-addiction, has been strongly influenced by Damasio's hypothesis. An article published in the Archives of Scientific Psychology in 2014 named Damasio one of the 100 most eminent psychologist of the modern era. (Diener et al. Archives of Scientific Psychology, 2014, 2, 20–32). The June–July issue of Sciences Humaines included Damasio in its list of 50 key thinkers in the human sciences of the past two centuries.

Damasio also proposed that emotions are part of homeostatic regulation and are rooted in reward/punishment mechanisms. He recovered William James' perspective on feelings as a read-out of body states, but expanded it with an "as-if-body-loop" device which allows for the substrate of feelings to be simulated rather than actual (foreshadowing the simulation process later uncovered by mirror neurons). He demonstrated experimentally that the insular cortex is a critical platform for feelings, a finding that has been widely replicated, and he uncovered cortical and subcortical induction sites for human emotions, e.g. in ventromedial prefrontal cortex and amygdala. He also demonstrated that while the insular cortex plays a major role in feelings, it is not necessary for feelings to occur, suggesting that brain stem structures play a basic role in the feeling process.

Damasio has continued to investigate the neural basis of feelings and demonstrated that although the insular cortex is a major substrate for this process it is not exclusive, suggesting that brain stem nuclei are critical platforms as well. He regards feelings as the necessary foundation of sentience.

In another development, Damasio proposed that the cortical architecture on which learning and recall depend involves multiple, hierarchically organized loops of axonal projections that converge on certain nodes out of which projections diverge to the points of origin of convergence (the convergence-divergence zones). This architecture is applicable to the understanding of memory processes and of aspects of consciousness related to the access of mental contents.

According to the University of Iowa's Department of Neurology's website, "Damasio's research depended significantly on establishing the modern human lesion method, an enterprise made possible by Hanna Damasio's structural neuroimaging/neuroanatomy work complemented by experimental neuroanatomy (with Gary Van Hoesen and Josef Parvizi), experimental neuropsychology (with Antoine Bechara, Ralph Adolphs, and Dan Tranel) and functional neuroimaging (with Kaspar Meyer, Jonas Kaplan, and Mary Helen Immordino-Yang)." The experimental neuroanatomy work with Van Hoesen and Bradley Hyman led to the discovery of the disconnection of the hippocampus caused by neurofibrillary tangles in the entorhinal cortex of patients with Alzheimer's disease.

As a clinician, he and his collaborators have studied and treated disorders of behaviour and cognition, and movement disorders.

Damasio is a member of the American Academy of Arts and Sciences, the National Academy of Medicine, the European Academy of Sciences and Arts. He is the recipient of several prizes, amongst them the Grawemeyer Award, the Honda Prize, the Prince of Asturias Award in Science and Technology and the Beaumont Medal from the American Medical Association, as well as honorary degrees from, most recently, the Sorbonne (Université Paris Descartes), shared with his wife Hanna Damasio. He has also received doctorates from the Universities of Aachen, Copenhagen, Leiden, Barcelona, Coimbra, Leuven and numerous others.

In 2013, the Escola Secundária António Damásio was dedicated in Lisbon.

Damasio says he writes in the belief that "scientific knowledge can be a pillar to help humans endure and prevail." He is married to Hanna Damasio, a prominent neuroscientist and frequent collaborator and co-author, who is a professor of neuroscience at the University of Southern California and the director of the Dornsife Neuroimaging Center.

In 2017, he was designated member of the Council of State of Portugal, replacing Antonio Guterres, the 9th Secretary-General of the United Nations. Damasio additionally serves on the board of directors of the Berggruen Institute, and sits on the jury for the Berggruen Prize for Philosophy.

== Literature ==
Damasio's books deal with the relationship between emotions and their brain substrates. His 1994 book, Descartes' Error: Emotion, Reason and the Human Brain, won the Science et Vie prize, was a finalist for the Los Angeles Times Book Award, and is translated in over 30 languages. It is regarded as one of the most influential books of the past two decades.

His second book, The Feeling of What Happens: Body and Emotion in the Making of Consciousness, was named as one of the ten best books of 2001 by the New York Times Book Review, a Publishers Weekly Best Book of the Year, a Library Journal Best Book of the Year, and has over 30 foreign editions. On the basis of a single-case experiment, Damasio suggested emotions belong to the automatic vital processes of the body and thus can be recognized by a person without any form of memory. In The Feeling of What Happens, Damasio laid the foundations of the "enchainment of precedences": "the nonconscious neural signaling of an individual organism begets the protoself which permits core self and core consciousness, which allow for an autobiographical self, which permits extended consciousness. At the end of the chain, extended consciousness permits conscience.

In 2003, this work was followed by the publication of Looking for Spinoza: Joy, Sorrow, and the Feeling Brain. In it, Damasio suggested that the philosopher Baruch Spinoza's thinking foreshadowed discoveries in biology and neuroscience views on the mind-body problem and that Spinoza was a protobiologist.

Damasio's fourth book, Self Comes to Mind: Constructing the Conscious Brain suggests that the self is the key to conscious minds and that feelings are the basic elements in the construction of the protoself and core self. The book received the Corinne International Book Prize.

Damasio's next books, The Strange Order of Things (2018), and Feeling and Knowing (2021) further developed his theory of consciousness, expanding on the role of the basic systems for homeostasis in the construction of consciousness.

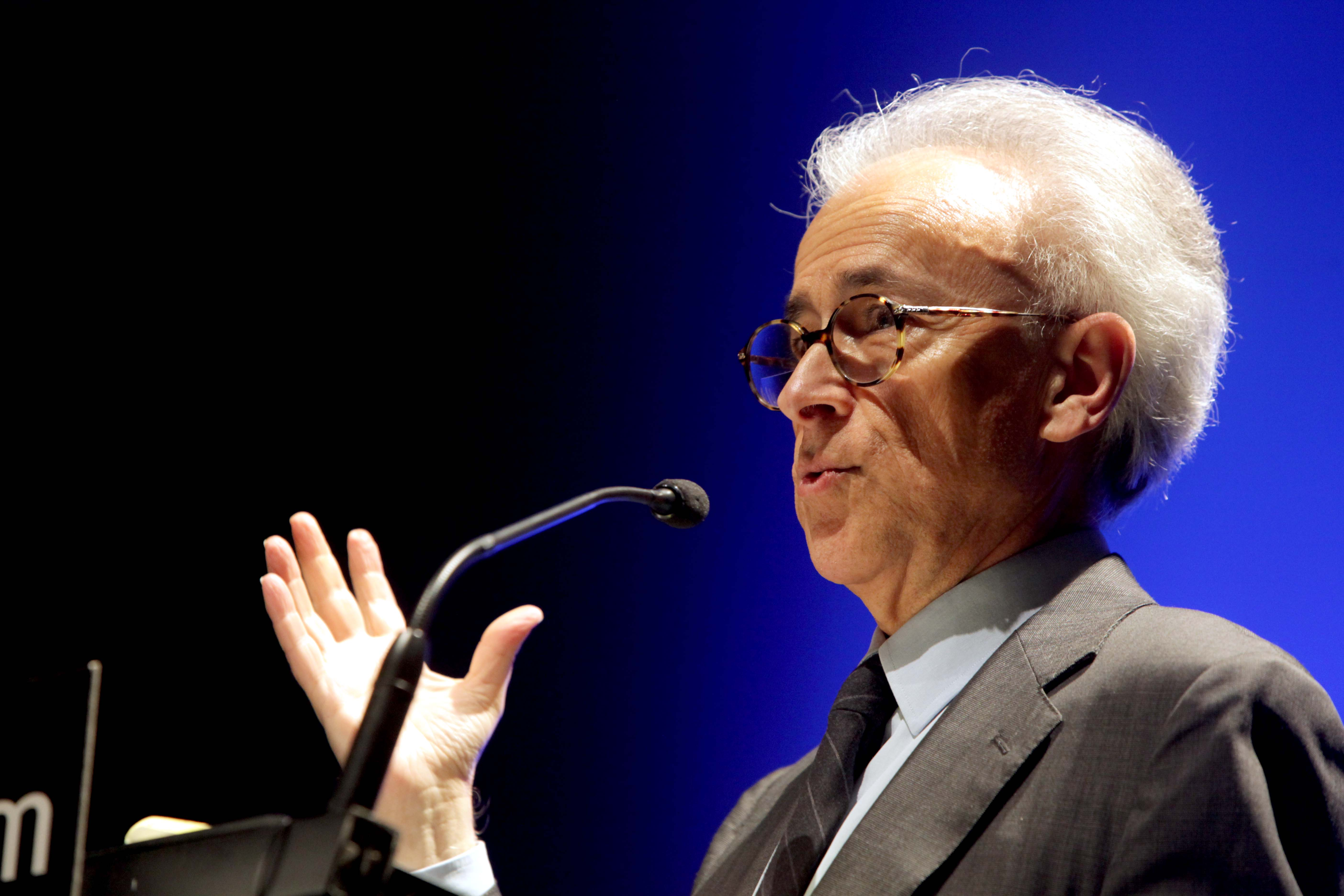
Damasio at Fronteiras do Pensamento (Frontiers of Thought) in 2013

== Selected bibliography ==
=== Books ===
- Descartes' Error: Emotion, Reason, and the Human Brain, Putnam, 1994; revised Penguin edition, 2005
- The Feeling of What Happens: Body and Emotion in the Making of Consciousness, Harcourt, 1999
- Looking for Spinoza: Joy, Sorrow, and the Feeling Brain, Harcourt, 2003
- Self Comes to Mind: Constructing the Conscious Brain, Pantheon, 2010. ISBN 978-1-5012-4695-1
- The Strange Order of Things: Life, Feeling, and the Making of Cultures, Pantheon, 2018.
- Feeling and Knowing: Making Minds Conscious, Pantheon, 2021
- Natural Intelligence and the Logic of Consciousness, Penguin Random House, 2025

=== Selected articles ===
- Fox G.R.; Kaplan J.; Damasio H.; Damasio A. (2015). "Neural correlates of gratitude". Frontiers in Psychology. 6 (1491): 1491. doi:10.3389/fpsyg.2015.01491. PMC 4588123. PMID 26483740.
- Sachs M.; Damasio A.; Habibi A. (2015). "The pleasures of sad music: a systematic review". Frontiers in Human Neuroscience. 9 (404): 1–12. doi:10.3389/fnhum.2015.00404. PMC 4513245. PMID 26257625.
- Man K.; Damasio A.; Meyer K.; Kaplan J.T. (2015). "Convergent and invariant object representations for sight, sound, and touch". Human Brain Mapping. 36 (9): 3629–3640. doi:10.1002/hbm.22867. PMC 6869094. PMID 26047030.
- Habibi A.; Damasio A. (2014). "Music, feelings and the human brain". Psychomusicology: Music, Mind and Brain. 24 (1): 92–102. doi:10.1037/pmu0000033.
- Man K, Kaplan JT, Damasio H, Damasio A (28 October 2013). "Neural convergence and divergence in the mammalian cerebral cortex: from experimental neuroanatomy to functional neuroimaging". Journal of Comparative Neurology. 521 (18): 4097–4111. doi:10.1002/cne.23408. PMC 3853095. PMID 23840023.
- Araujo HP, Kaplan JT, Damasio A (4 September 2013). "Cortical midline structures and autobiographical-self processes: an activation-likelihood estimation (ALE) meta-analysis". Frontiers in Human Neuroscience. 7: 548. doi:10.3389/fnhum.2013.00548. PMC 3762365. PMID 24027520.
- Damasio, A; Carvalho, GB (2013). "The nature of feelings: Evolutionary and neurobiological origins". Nature Reviews. Neuroscience. 14 (2): 143–52. doi:10.1038/nrn3403. PMID 23329161. S2CID 35232202.
- Damasio A, Damasio H, Tranel D (2012). "Persistence of feelings and sentience after bilateral damage of the insula". Cerebral Cortex. 23 (4): 833–46. doi:10.1093/cercor/bhs077. PMC 3657385. PMID 22473895.
- Feinstein J, Adolphs R, Damasio A, Tranel D (2011). "The human amygdala and the induction and experience of fear". Current Biology. 21 (1): 1–5. Bibcode:2011CBio...21...34F. doi:10.1016/j.cub.2010.11.042. PMC 3030206. PMID 21167712.
- Meyer K, Kaplan JT, Essex R, Damasio H, Damasio A (2011). "Seeing touch is correlated with content-specific activity in primary somatosensory cortex". Cerebral Cortex. 21 (9): 2113–2121. doi:10.1093/cercor/bhq289. PMC 3155604. PMID 21330469.
- Meyer K, Kaplan JT, Essex R, Webber C, Damasio H, Damasio A (2010). "Predicting visual stimuli based on activity in auditory cortices". Nature Neuroscience. 13 (6): 667–668. doi:10.1038/nn.2533. PMID 20436482. S2CID 8226089.
- Meyer K, Damasio A (2009). "Convergence and divergence in a neural architecture for recognition and memory". Trends in Neurosciences. 32 (7): 376–382. doi:10.1016/j.tins.2009.04.002. PMID 19520438. S2CID 205403597.
- Immordino-Yang MH, McColl A, Damasio H, Damasio A (2009). "Neural correlates of admiration and compassion". Proceedings of the National Academy of Sciences of the United States of America. 106 (19): 8021–8026. doi:10.1073/pnas.0810363106. PMC 2670880. PMID 19414310.
- Damasio A, Meyer K (2008). "Behind the looking glass". Nature. 454 (7201): 167–168. Bibcode:2008Natur.454..167D. doi:10.1038/454167a. PMID 18615070. S2CID 200767224.
- Parvizi J, Van Hoesen G, Buckwalter J, Damasio A (2006). "Neural connections of the posteromedial cortex in the macaque: Implications for the understanding of the neural basis of consciousness". Proceedings of the National Academy of Sciences of the United States of America. 103 (5): 1563–1568. doi:10.1073/pnas.0507729103. PMC 1345704. PMID 16432221.
- Shiv B, Lowenstein G, Bechara A, Damasio H, Damasio A (2005). "Investment behavior and the negative side of emotion". Psychological Science. 16 (6): 435–439. doi:10.1111/j.0956-7976.2005.01553.x. PMID 15943668. S2CID 11590885.
- Parvizi J, Damasio AR (2003). "Neuroanatomical correlates of brainstem coma". Brain. 126 (Pt 7): 1524–1536. doi:10.1093/brain/awg166. PMID 12805123.
- Parvizi J, Damasio AR (2001). "Consciousness and the brainstem". Cognition. 79 (1–2): 135–160. doi:10.1016/S0010-0277(00)00127-X. PMID 11164026. S2CID 205872101.
- Damasio AR, Grabowski TJ, Bechara A, Damasio H, Ponto LL, Parvizi J, Hichwa RD (2000). "Subcortical and cortical brain activity during the feeling of self-generated emotions". Nature Neuroscience. 3 (10): 1049–1056. doi:10.1038/79871. PMID 11017179. S2CID 3352415.
- Damasio AR. (1999). "How the brain creates the mind". Scientific American. 281 (6): 74–79. Bibcode:1999SciAm.281f.112D. doi:10.1038/scientificamerican1299-112. PMID 10614073.
- Damasio AR (1998). "Investigating the biology of consciousness". Philosophical Transactions of the Royal Society of London. Series B: Biological Sciences. 353 (1377): 1879–1882. doi:10.1098/rstb.1998.0339. PMC 1692416. PMID 9854259.
- Bechara A, Damasio H, Tranel D, Damasio AR (1997). "Deciding advantageously before knowing the advantageous strategy". Science. 275 (5304): 1293–1294. doi:10.1126/science.275.5304.1293. PMID 9036851. S2CID 4942279.
- Damasio AR. (1996). "The somatic marker hypothesis and the possible functions of the prefrontal cortex". Philosophical Transactions of the Royal Society of London. Series B: Biological Sciences. 351 (1346): 1413–1420. doi:10.1098/rstb.1996.0125. PMID 8941953. S2CID 1841280.
- Bechara A, Damasio AR, Damasio H, Anderson S (1994). "Insensitivity to future consequences following damage to human prefrontal cortex". Cognition. 50 (1–3): 7–15. doi:10.1016/0010-0277(94)90018-3. PMID 8039375. S2CID 204981454.
- Adolphs R, Tranel D, Damasio AR (1994). "Impaired recognition of emotion in facial expressions following bilateral damage to the human amygdala". Nature. 372 (6507): 669–672. Bibcode:1994Natur.372..669A. doi:10.1038/372669a0. PMID 7990957. S2CID 25169376.
- Damasio AR, Tranel D (1993). "Nouns and verbs are retrieved with differently distributed neural systems". Proceedings of the National Academy of Sciences of the United States of America. 90 (11): 4957–4960. Bibcode:1993PNAS...90.4957D. doi:10.1073/pnas.90.11.4957. PMC 46632. PMID 8506341.
- Damasio A, Tranel D, Damasio H (1990). "Face agnosia and the neural substrates of memory". Annual Review of Neuroscience. 13: 89–109. doi:10.1146/annurev.ne.13.030190.000513. PMID 2183687.
- Damasio AR. (1989). "Time-locked multiregional retroactivation: A systems level proposal for the neural substrates of recall and recognition". Cognition. 33 (1–2): 25–62. doi:10.1016/0010-0277(89)90005-X. PMID 2691184. S2CID 34115898.
- Tranel D, Damasio A (1985). "Knowledge without awareness: An autonomic index of facial recognition by prosopagnosics". Science. 228 (21): 1453–1454. Bibcode:1985Sci...228.1453T. doi:10.1126/science.4012303. PMID 4012303.
- Hyman B, Van Hoesen GW, Damasio A, Barnes C (1984). "Alzheimer's disease: Cell-specific pathology isolates the hippocampal formation". Science. 225 (4667): 1168–1170. Bibcode:1984Sci...225.1168H. doi:10.1126/science.6474172. PMID 6474172.
- Damasio A, Geschwind N (1984). "The neural basis of language". Annual Review of Neuroscience. 7: 127–147. doi:10.1146/annurev.ne.07.030184.001015. PMID 6370077.
- Anderson SW, Bechara A, Damasio H, Tranel D, Damasio AR (1999). "Impairment of social and moral behaviour related to early damage in human prefrontal cortex". Nature Neuroscience. 2 (11): 1032–1037. doi:10.1038/14833. PMID 10526345. S2CID 204990285.

== See also ==
- Brain and Creativity Institute
- Damasio's theory of consciousness
- Insular cortex
- Hanna Damasio
- Joseph E. LeDoux
