= Hanna Damasio =

Portuguese cognitive neuroscientist

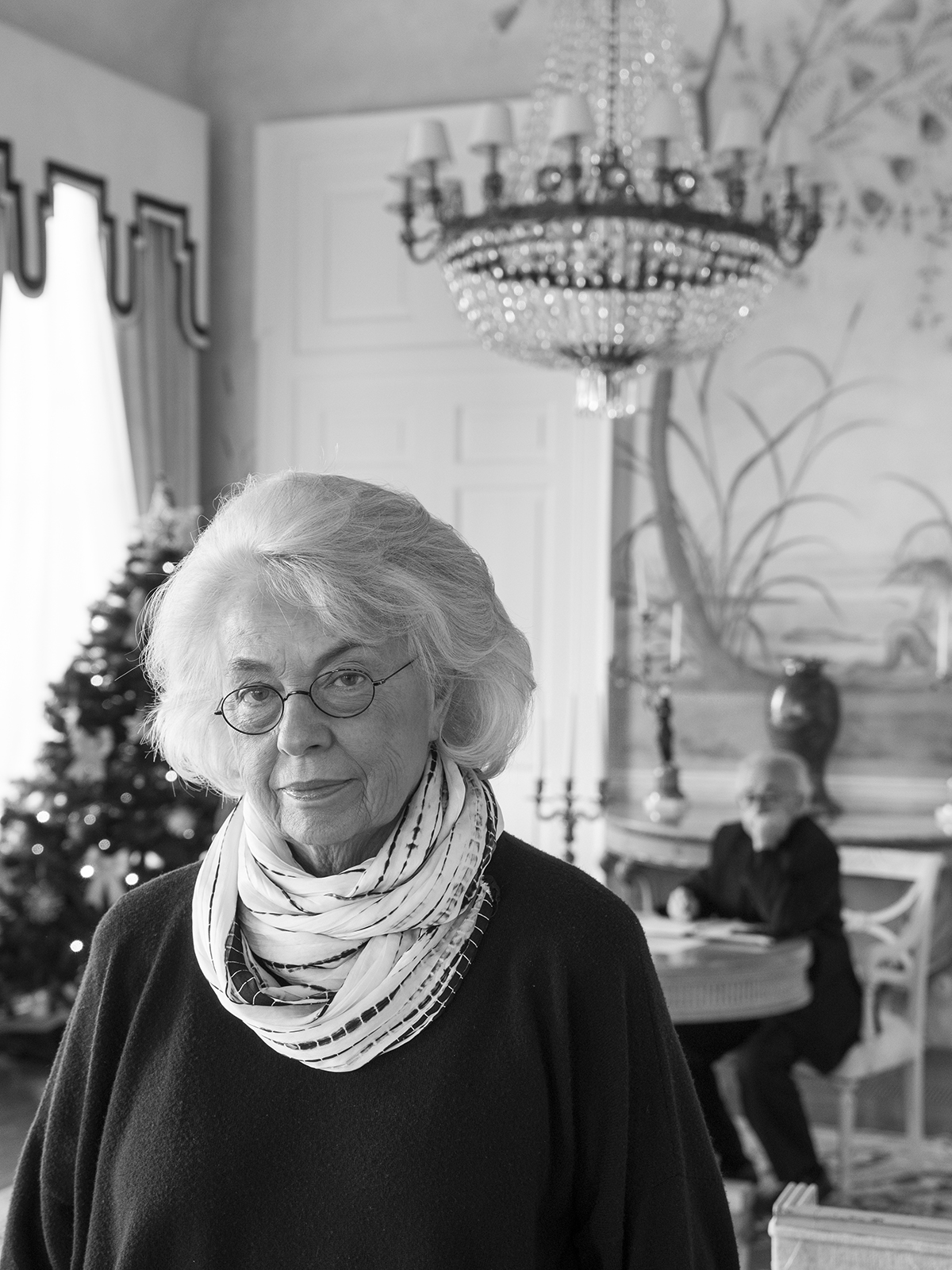
- Born: Lisbon, Portugal
- Education: University of Lisbon (MD, 1969)
- Spouse: Antonio Damasio
- Awards: Pessoa Prize (1992); Elected to the American Neurological Association (1995); Elected to the American Academy of Arts and Sciences (1997); Jean-Louis Signoret Prize in Cognitive Neuroscience (2004)
- Scientific career
- Fields: Cognitive neuroscience
- Institutions: University of Southern California

Hanna Damasio is a scientist in the field of cognitive neuroscience. Using computerized tomography and magnetic resonance imaging, she has developed methods of investigating human brain structure and studied functions such as language, memory, and emotion, using both the lesion method and functional neuroimaging. She is currently a Dana Dornsife Professor of Neuroscience and Director of the Dana and David Dornsife Cognitive Neuroscience Imaging Center at the University of Southern California.

== Career and research ==
After obtaining a Doctor of Medicine from the University of Lisbon in 1969, Damasio began her career in academia as an instructor in the Department of Neurology at the University of Iowa in 1976. She quickly climbed the academic ladder, becoming a professor in the Department of Neurology in 1985. In addition to academic appointments, Damasio was also employed as the Director of the Laboratory for Neuroimaging and Human Neuroanatomy at the University of Iowa from 1982 to 2004. She continues to serve as a distinguished adjunct professor at the University of Iowa. Currently, Damasio is a Dana Dornsife Professor of Neuroscience and Director of the Dana and David Dornsife Cognitive Neuroscience Imaging Center at the University of Southern California.

Damasio utilizes brain imaging methods, such as computerized tomography and nuclear magnetic resonance, to enhance the diagnoses protocols for diseases that affect the brain. Her current projects include: developing new techniques to investigate brain structure in vivo using magnetic resonance, developing new techniques to evaluate experimental results in positron emission tomography (PET), and investigating the neuroanatomical substrates of language, memory, emotion, and decision-making using the lesion method. Her work has resulted in numerous scientific articles which appeared in leading journals. In 1989, she published Lesion Analysis in Neuropsychology (Oxford University Press), a classic textbook for which she received the Prize for Outstanding Book of the Year in Bio and Medical Sciences from the Association of American Publishers. Her continued interest in human neuroanatomy led her to develop the first atlas of the human brain based on computer tomography images: "Human Brain Anatomy in Computerized Images", also published by Oxford University Press. The book is a recognized reference now in its second edition.

== Honors and awards ==
Damasio was awarded the Pessoa Prize in 1992 for her contributions in science and literature. She was elected to the American Neurological Association in 1995 and recognized as a Fellow of the American Academy of Arts and Sciences in 1997. In 2004, she shared the Jean-Louis Signoret Prize in cognitive neuroscience for pioneering work in social cognition. In 2010, she was a co-recipient of the Cozzarelli Prize from the United States National Academy of Sciences, attributed to the best article in behavioral neuroscience published in the Proceedings of the National Academy of Sciences in 2009. In 2011, Hanna Damasio and her husband Antonio Damasio received honorary doctorate degrees from Ecole Polytechnique Federale de Lausanne (EPFL) in Switzerland for their contributions in neurology. She also holds honorary doctorate degrees from, most recently, the Sorbonne (Université Paris Descartes), the Universitat Oberta de Catalunya (Open University of Catalonia, Barcelona), and the Universities of Lisbon and Aachen.

== Personal life ==
Hanna Damasio is married to Antonio Damasio, a neurologist and expert in the relationship between emotion and cognition, with whom she co-directs the Brain and Creativity Institute (BCI) at the University of Southern California. In her spare time, she is a sculptor.

== Quotes ==
- "The case for women in science and medicine has been made and won."
- "This has had a truly liberating effect. It allows us to behave toward each other as colleagues, regardless of gender, and to expect the same opportunities and the same behavior."
