= Ger C. Bout =

Dutch architect and artist in Rotterdam, Netherlands

- Born: 1950 (age 75–76); Rotterdam, Netherlands
- Known for: Furniture, Architecture, Installation, Public Art & Photography
- Movement: Modern Art

Ger C. Bout (1950-2017) was a Dutch architect and artist based in Rotterdam, the Netherlands. Following years of completing furniture designs, architectural structures and installations, Bout began initiating large scale projects in public spaces internationally. In recent years he has focused on and incorporated photography into his projects. His ideas are always process based; he applies multiple techniques and skills to realise his work using varieties of mediums and expressions from architecture to furniture design, installation, drawing, performance, sculpture and photography.

== Early life and education ==
Bout grew up in the south of Rotterdam in an efficacious but modern housing development that was inspired by CIAM and Team Ten thoughts. He much enjoyed spending his free time helping his grandfather at the lively colorful outdoor market. His first creations as a child consisted of playful combinations of crates of oranges and other containers he found at the market. Besides that, he enjoyed drawing classes. His first group show took place at the age of 11 at the Museum Boymans van Beuningen in Rotterdam.

He went on to graduate from the Technical University of Delft in the Netherlands. His thesis investigated how the layout of urban planning influenced human behavior. During his studies he worked in Linz, Austria, where he met his Finnish wife Riitta. He then followed her to Finland where he was invited to work for the Department of Architecture at the University of Otaniemi, near Helsinki. All the while he continued to design and produce furniture.

=== Furniture and building ===
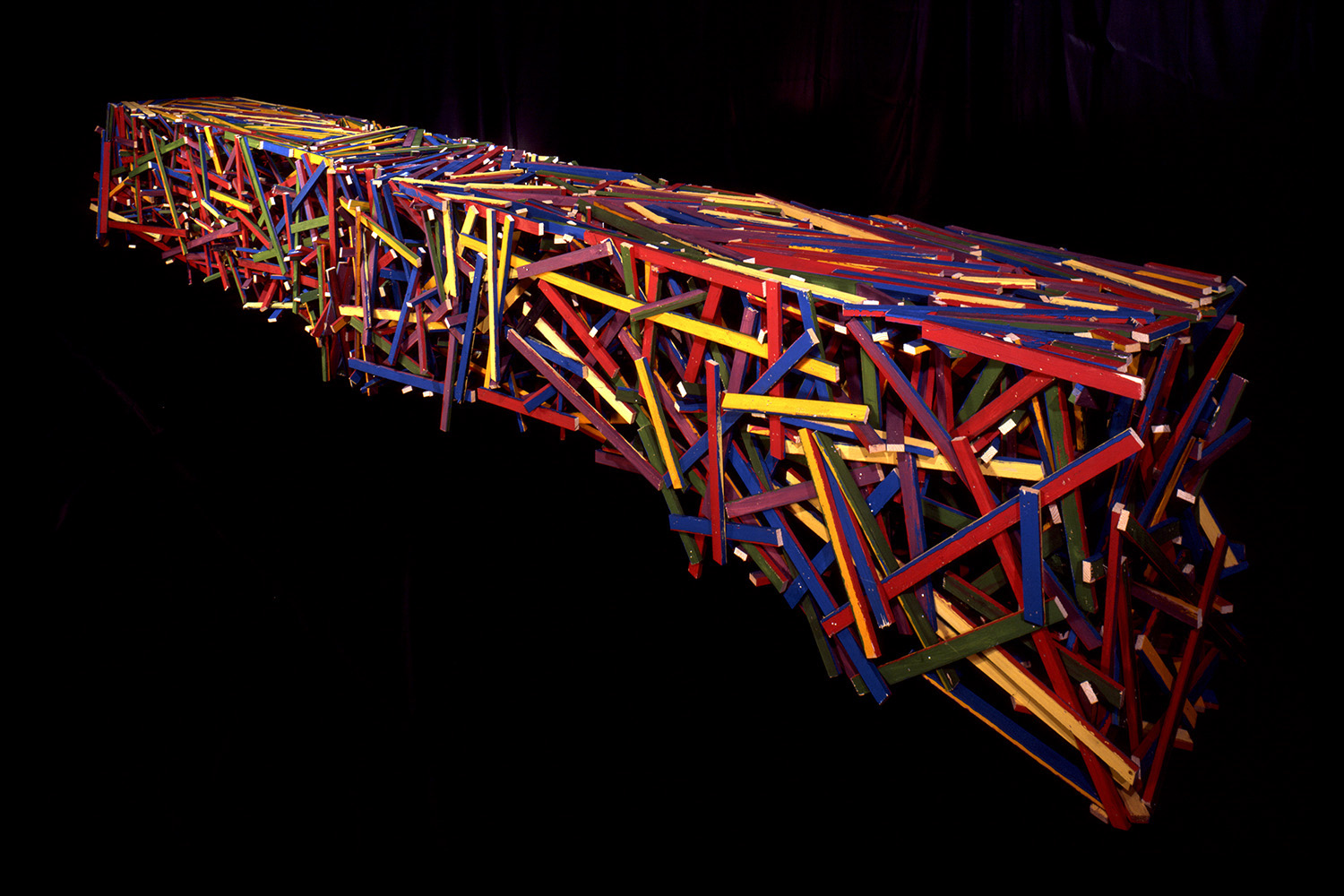
Table No 1 (1993)

By the end of the 1970s the couple moved to the Netherlands. Bout started working as an architect-builder, while continuing to design and produce furniture in small series. Simultaneously, he served as a consultant for resident-participation building projects, co-producing exhibitions like "Bewoners voor de Keus" (Spijkenisse, 1978) and "van Dakkapel tot Droomkasteel" (Lijnbaancentrum, Rotterdam, 1978). For a number of years he was appointed director for a school of architecture in Utrecht. In 1983 Riitta and Ger moved to their new home in Rotterdam where they began a lifelong on-going renovation project. Continuously assisted by numerous craftsmen and artists, they completely restyled and rebuilt their urban dwelling into an iconic and artistic statement. In the initial period Bout established his own architectural practice designing low budget mass-produced residences for housing corporations and project-development companies, but he firmly did not like that way of working.

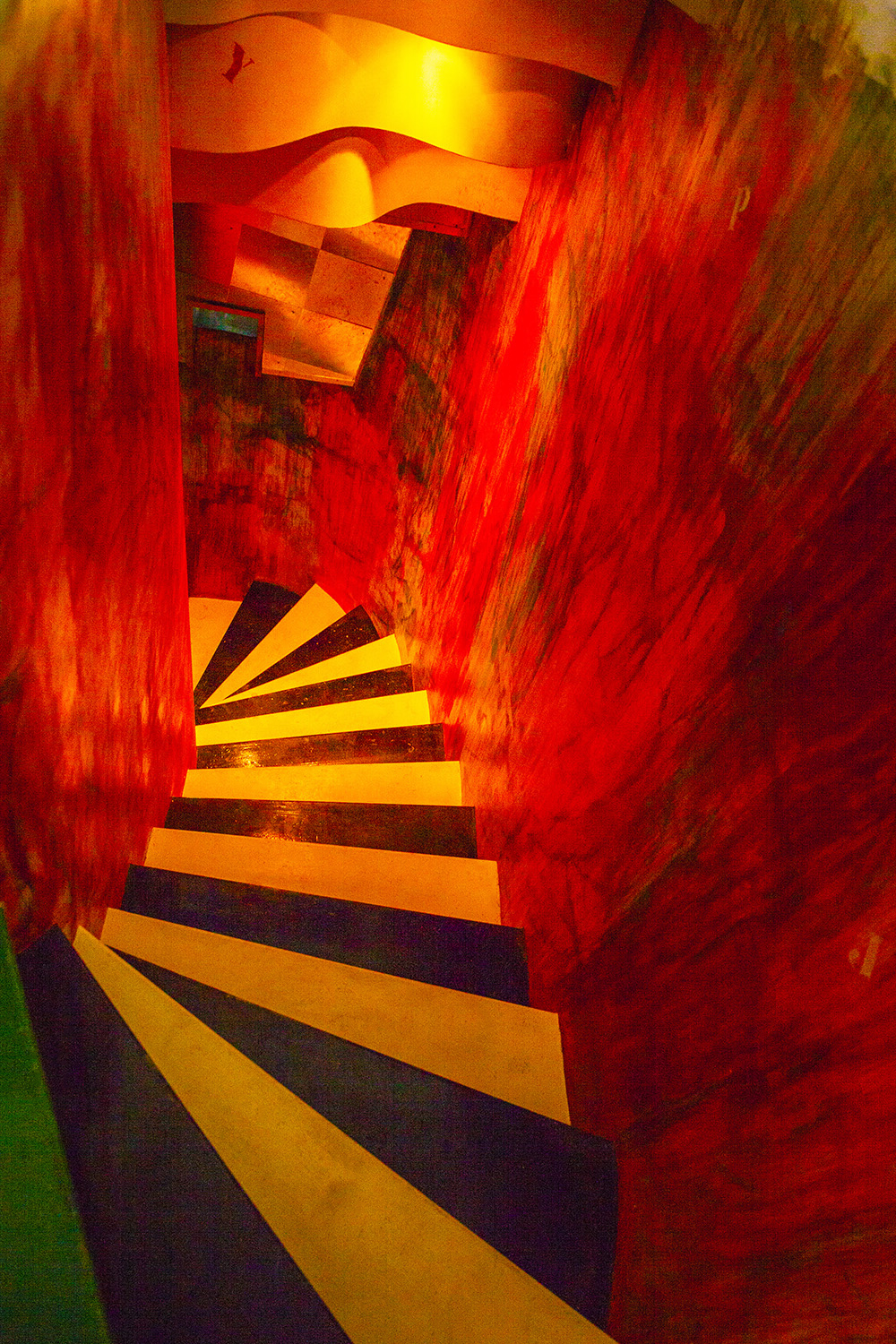
The House (1983 - ongoing)

At this same time, he initiated and produced a performance installation with the Rotterdam School of Dance: "Bewegingsmaat 226". In addition to this, he participated in a number of concours and won the 1984 Finnish competition for his design on playing elements for children.

His furniture pieces were first presented in Items magazine and at the Items presentations (Delft, 1982 ), as well as in various other places around the Netherlands and Belgium. These include among else the La Linea Design Gallery (Brussels, 1983), the Westersingel Galerie (Rotterdam, 1984), the Puntgaaf Gallery (Groningen, 1995), the Frozen Fountain (Amsterdam, 1995 & 1997), the Goethe Institute (Rotterdam, 1998), and furniture fairs in Breda, Kortrijk and Utrecht. Furthermore, his work has been exhibited at internationally renowned venues, such as the International Furniture Design Competition in Asahikawa (where he was selected for an outstanding special award) and the International Furniture Fair in Tokyo (1993).

=== Museum and gallery work ===
Thanks to several grants by the Dutch government at the end of the eighties, Bout travelled extensively in California and New York. During these trips he had a series of encounters that proved to have a significant impact on his work, mainly in terms of re-thinking his way of working and collaborative practices. Back in the Netherlands, he decided to express his ideas his own way. He formed a new creative team, which participated in architectural competitions such as the Finnish Pavilion at the world Expo in Sevilla (Helsinki, 1989), the extension of the Teylers Museum (Haarlem, 1990) and the Parthenon Museum (Athens, 1990).

Gradually Bout's horizons opened up as he was able to work with large groups of people and actualize his ideas in installations. The projects included a.o. "The Crate House" (De Unie, Rotterdam, 1990); "5 Spaces" (Department of Architecture, Delft, 1991); HCAK (the Hague, 1992); "For Misia" (The Art School, Arnhem, 1992); "The House Project"; Pori Art Museum (Pori, 1993); "Full House", Vertoningsruimte Argument (Tilburg, 1994); Indesem, Department of Industrial Design, Delft University, (Delft, 1994); the "Magic Restaurant" (Oulu, 1994), 300 Grams of Wool, Nylistasafnid (Reykjavik, 1995). In all of these installation projects Bout went beyond architecture and set his own course.

=== Public art projects ===
Starting in the mid nineties Bout created a series of large scale 3D drawings, beginning with the "A Transparent Dream" (Turku, 1996), " A Table and 4 Chairs" (Antwerp,1998) and later the "Fisherman" (Helsinki Cultural Capital, 2000). Each of these three projects dealt with basic issues: living (the "Transparent Dream"), working (as in “Fishing”), and interaction with others ("A Table and 4 Chairs").

“A Transparent Dream” was successfully realized in Turku with the help of local artists, art organizations, local resident associations, city officials and most of all local craftsmen and companies. There was a massive public adherence and an engaging national public debate about the relationship between a public artwork and its environment and the relationship between architecture and environmental art. “A Transparent Dream” was inaugurated in the autumn of 1996 as part of the International Collection of the Pro Cultura Foundation in Turku.

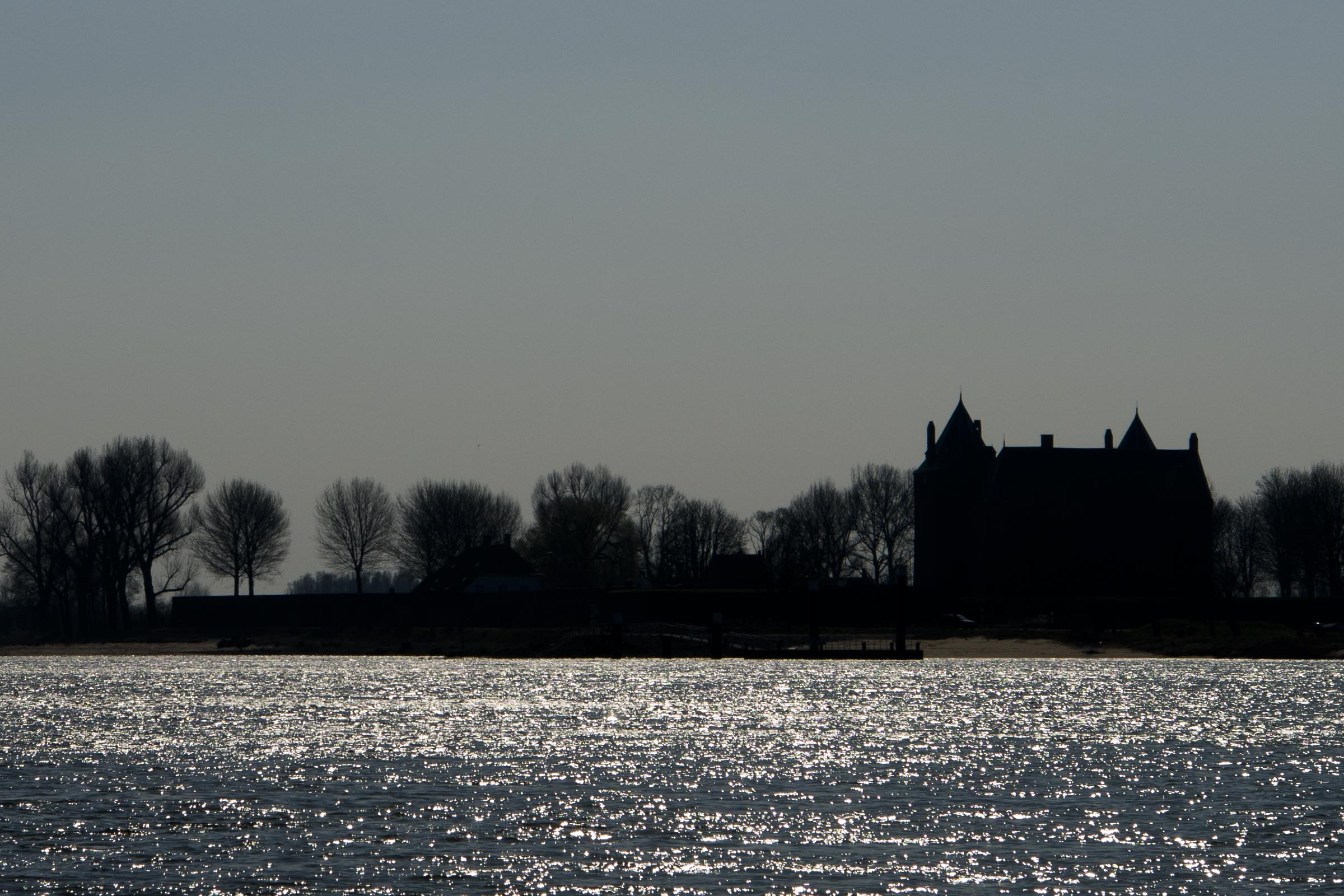
The River (along the rivers connecting Rotterdam to Istanbul, 2007 – ongoing)

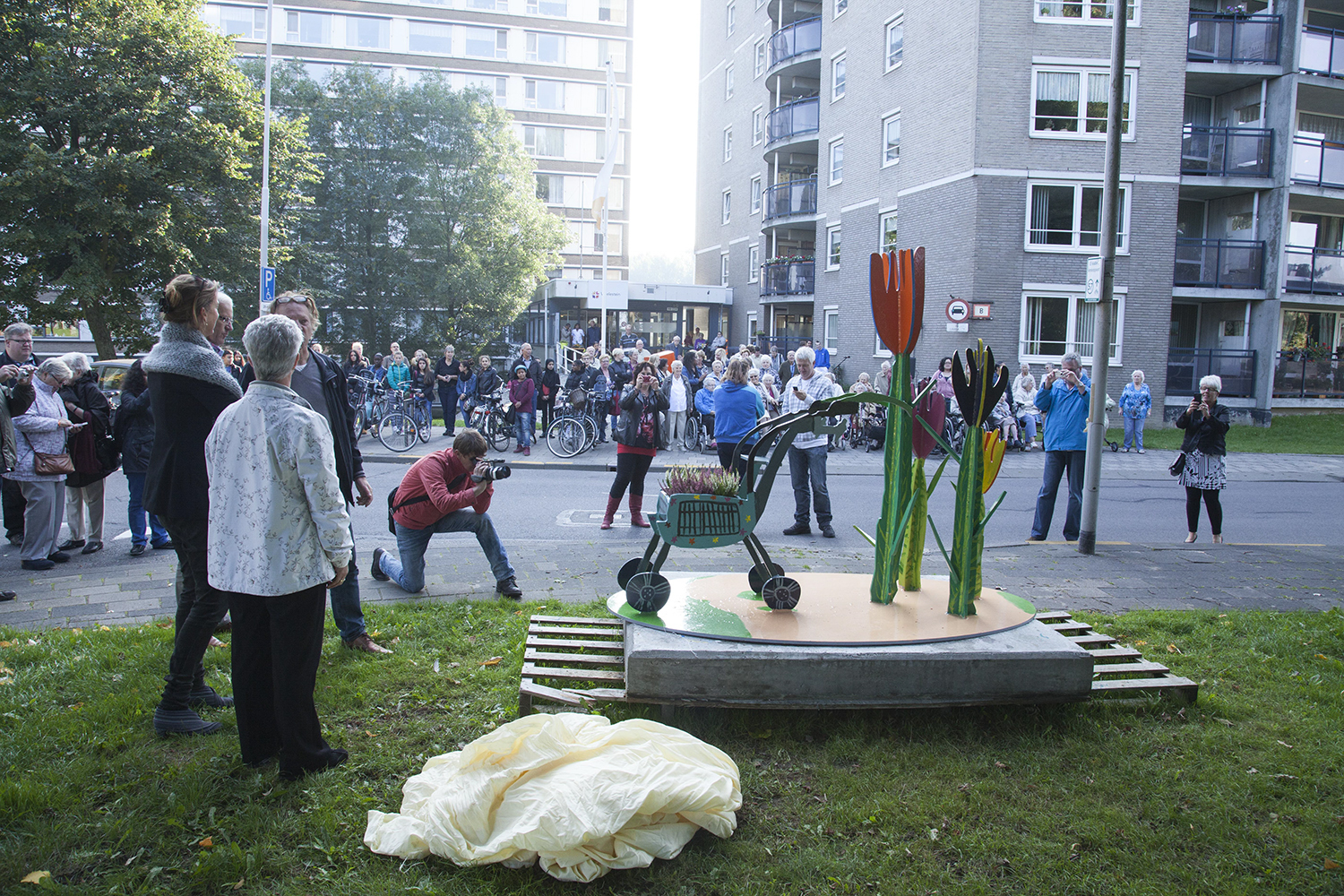
The Tulips (2009 – ongoing)

“A Table and 4 Chairs" took off in Antwerp and was well received by the press. However, after long series of discussions and meetings, the project still has yet to be carried out. Finally, the third project entitled the "Fisherman" got started in Helsinki as part of the Helsinki Cultural Capital program. There was extensive preparation and more than 400 meetings took place for it. It was agreed that students from several professional schools would construct the fisherman while local companies would sponsor the materials. The Coastguard promised to transport the Fisherman by helicopter to its permanent location in the Helsinki harbor. Everything was set to go when the project was declared impossible by a member of the board of the Helsinki municipality. Fortunately, almost directly afterwards the project took off in Rotterdam. The "Fisherman" got a big warm welcome in this city. Bout (working without resources and paying his own expenses) mobilized an enormous team in order to meet the highly demanding production needs. With lots of enthusiasm but no budget, hundreds of students from vocational schools, numerous local companies, organizations and many others helped give form to building the "Fisherman". They used a small scale model instead of drawings as their guideline and worked together in a very organic process. The actual "Fisherman" was completed in September 2006. It is located not far from the access to the pedestrian tunnel on the south side of the Maas (Meuse). It stands 10 meters tall and its fishing rod is 22 meters long. Consequently, one of the board members of the City of Rotterdam suggested realizing a second Fisherman as a gift to the City of Istanbul. The idea was to get students from schools situated along the rivers connecting Rotterdam and Istanbul to collaborate. Bout subsequently collected a series of pictures ("The River") to prepare a presentation, but also to get an idea himself of the route the new Fishermen would have to travel and the many obstacles that might be encountered along the way. However, the Fisherman project for Istanbul never came about since Bout did not want to work again without sufficient funding. "The River" collection of photo's became another ongoing project of his.

The "Tulips" project was initiated in 2007 in close collaboration with Mart Bechtold. It's a long term ongoing project entailing the participation of thousands of young and old people who are helping to create a web of colorful human scale tulips made of steel. In 2009 two tulips were placed at the entrance to the Rotterdam City Hall as symbols of the Rotterdam European Youth Capital. More than 30 tulips are now scattered along public spaces in the southern part of the city of Rotterdam. They form a growing web that stretches from the highway in the East to the harbor in the West.

=== Solo ===
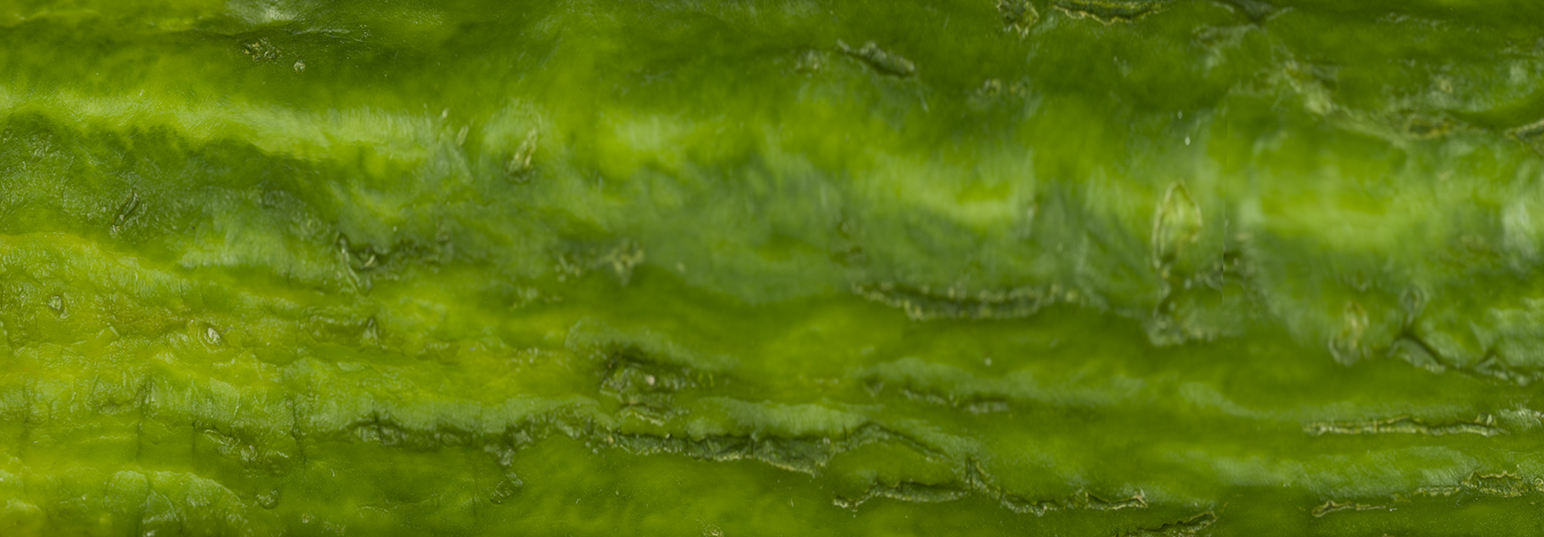
Reds and Greens (2014)

Bout gradually found that the images he presented played an essential role in his projects. With just a few images and hardly any explanation, the proposals he submitted were met with enthusiasm. He created new buildings–new installations–and in that way, also new images. Some projects existed for only 24 hours, while others seem to stay forever. Images have always played an essential role in his work and in his contacts with others. After making large-scale international-projects for more than 25 years, Bout now concentrates on images themselves as a solo artist. Photography always fascinated Bout. In his youth he used simple camera's and homebuilt darkroom equipment set up in his parents' converted bathroom. Now he likes to use old fashioned large format camera's and modern digital camera's and printers to produce his work. Early in his career he would invite other people to photograph for him, more and more he has begun documenting everything himself. His attention went from photography as a medium for documentation to photography as an independent way of creating images.

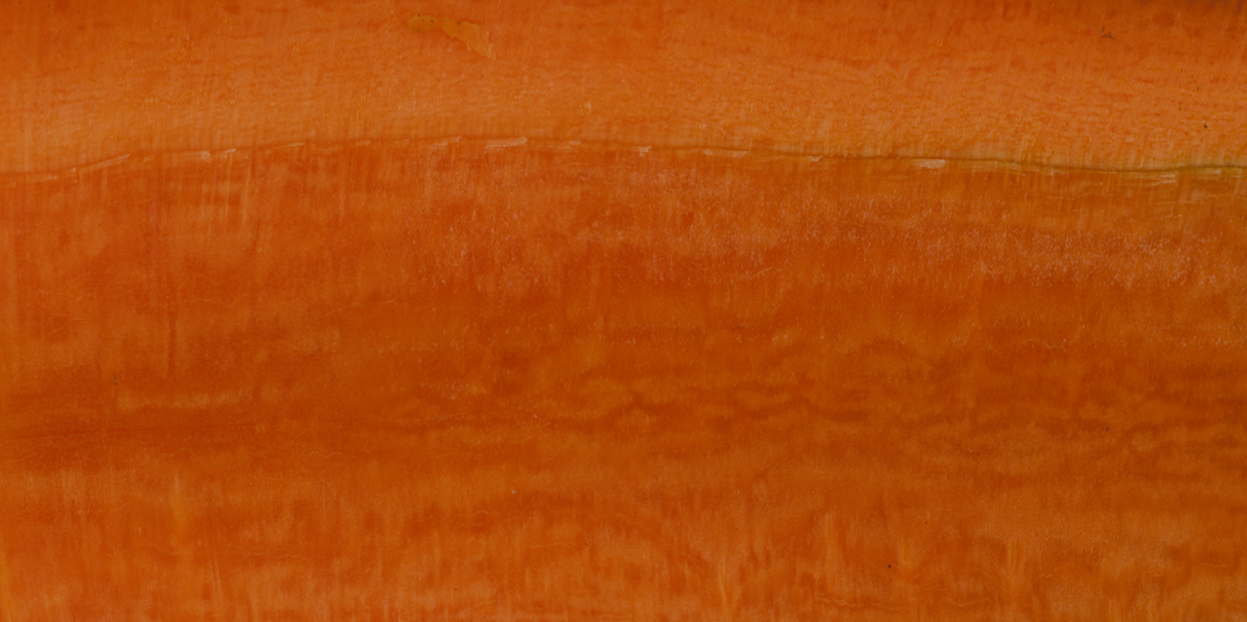
The Oranges (2015)

In other words, employing combinations of old-fashioned large format cameras and digital cameras, Bout focuses today on photographic images as ideas and their effects: from body landscapes to anemones and the effect of light over water. Bout clearly plays with texture and light and their effects; he creates an imagery that is as diverse, experimental and captivating, as much so as his previous enterprises were.

His recent photographic pursuits have been compiled into a series of books: "The Trees We Can See From Our Window Every Day"; "Flowers XS"; "Beyond the Moon"; "Reds and Greens", and "The Oranges". More collections and publications are underway.

=== Others ===
Parallel to his vocation as an architect and an artist, Bout continues to work and collaborate with people from all different backgrounds, nationalities, ages and educational levels. Many of his volunteers or have studied art, music, dance and architecture at European schools.

Bout was invited in 2001 for a professorship at the University of Hokkaido but had to decline this offer due to the care for his elderly parents.

=== Collaborations ===
Bout has collaborated nationally and internationally with renowned institutions like the Pori Art Museum ("The House Project"), Oulu Art Museum ("The Magic Restaurant"), Wäinö Aaltonen Museo Turku ("The Transparent Dream") and the Ars Nova-Aboa Vetus Museum (Turku, Finland).

== Exhibitions ==
- The Netherlands: Frozen Fountain, Amsterdam; Galerie Westersingel, Rotterdam; Goethe Instituut, Rotterdam; Het Turfschip, Breda; Items Design Galerie, Delft; Meubel Beurs Utrecht, Utrecht; Museum Boymans van Beuningen, Rotterdam and Puntgaaf Galerie, Groningen.
- Belgium: Biënnale Interieur, Kortrijk; Kloosterstraat Gallery, Antwerp; La Linea Design Gallery, Brussels and Montevideo Gallery, Antwerp.
- Iceland: Nylistsavnid, the Artist’ s Museum, Reykjavik.
- Finland: Pori Art Museum, Pori; Oulu Art Museum, Oulu; Rovaniemi Art Museum, Rovaniemi; Titanic Gallery, Turku and Wäinö Aaltonen Museum & Ars Nova-Aboavetus Museum.
- Japan: The International Furniture Design Competition, Asahikawa and International Furniture Fair, Tokyo.

== Awards ==
Bout has been awarded grants from the Dutch Government and many other Institutions.

In 1993 he won the Jury's Special Award at the Tokyo Furniture Fair.

== Collections ==
His work can be found in private and institutional collections in Europe, Japan, and the United States.

== Selected projects, proposals and photography ==
- 226, Schouwburgplein (Rotterdam, 1983)
- The Crate House, de Unie, Rotterdam Art Foundation (Rotterdam, 1990)
- 5 Spaces, Department of Architecture at the University of Delft (Delft, 1991)
- HCAK (The Hague, 1992)
- For Misia, Arnhem Academy for Art and Design (Arnhem 1992)
- Table No 1, Asahikawa International Furniture Design Competition (Asahikawa, 1993)
- The House Project, Pori Art Museum (Finland, 1993)
- Indesem, Department of Industrial Design, (Delft University of Technology 1994)
- Full House (Argument, Tilburg, 1994)
- The Magic Restaurant (large team cooperation and Oulu Art Museum, Oulu, 1994)
- 300 Grams of Wool, The Living Art Museum (Nýló) (Reykjavík, 1995)
- Licht in Kampen, Kunstruimte Kampen (Kampen, 1995)
- A Transparent Dream, Wäinö Aaltonen and Ars Nova aboa Vetus Museum (Turku, 1996)
- A House of Frozen Water, Rovaniemi Art Museum, (not yet realized, Rovaniemi, 1997)
- About Fruit, Food and Other Things, Haifa Art Museum (not yet realized, Haifa, 1997)
- Fixed Images, Project Proposal for Konstihoone (Tallinna, 1997)
- A Table and 4 Chairs, City of Antwerp (not yet realized, Antwerp, 1998)
- The Berlin Project, Goethe Institute (not yet realized, Rotterdam 1998)
- The Boat, A project Proposal for the City of Rotterdam (not yet realized, Rotterdam, 1998)
- The Fisherman, Helsinki Cultural Capital, 2000 (declared impossible after extensive preparations, Helsinki, 2000)
- Wood, Stone and Water, A Project Proposal for Kainuun Etu, (not yet realized, Kajaani, 2001)
- Competition Entry for the Nam June Paik Museum, (Kyonggi 2003)
- Competition Entry for the Chi Chi Earth Quake, The Memorial Garden, Visions of Light (Taipei, 2003)
- The Fisherman, City of Rotterdam (Rotterdam, 2006)
- A Fisherman for Istanbul (not yet realized, Rotterdam, 2007)
- The Tulips (the Hague, Lisse, Naaldwijk and Rotterdam, 2009 – ongoing)
- Berlin (2007 – ongoing)
- The River (along the rivers connecting Rotterdam to Istanbul, 2007 – ongoing)
- New York (2011 – ongoing)
- Flowers XS (2012)
- The Trees We Can See From Our Window Every Day (2014)
- Reds and Greens (2014)
- The Anemones (2015)
- The Oranges (2015)
- Beyond the Moon (2015)

== Bibliography ==
- 13 ontwerpers uit de Rijnmond. Rotterdam, The Netherlands: The Westersingel Gallery, 1984. Print.
- Ger C. Bout. The Hague, The Netherlands: Haags Centrum voor Aktuele Kunst, 1992. Print.
- The House Project. Pori, Finland: Pori Art Museum, 1993. Print.
- Asahikawa International Furniture Design Competition. Asahikawa, Japan: Asahikawa International Furniture Design Competition, 1993. Print.
- Hujala, Susanna, and Päivi Finel. Näkymätön kaupunki: Wainö Aaltosen museo 19.04. – 2 June 2002 / The invisible city: Wainö Aaltonen museum of art: 19 April – 2 June 2002. Turku, Finland: Wainö Aaltosen Museo, 2002. Print. ISBN 952-9565-35-6.
- Katiskoski, Kaarina, et al. Turun ympäristötaideprojektin teokset: 14 kohdetta kaupunkikuvassa: 1994–2000 / Environmental art works in Turku: 14 objects in the cityscape: 1994–2000. Turku, Finland: Wäinö Aaltosen Museo, 2001. Print. ISBN 9789529565313.
- Various authors, Stichting kunstruimte Kampen, 47 projecten, 69 kunstenaars. The Netherlands: Stichting kunstruimte Kampen, 1996. Print. ISBN 90-803260-1-1.

== Gallery ==
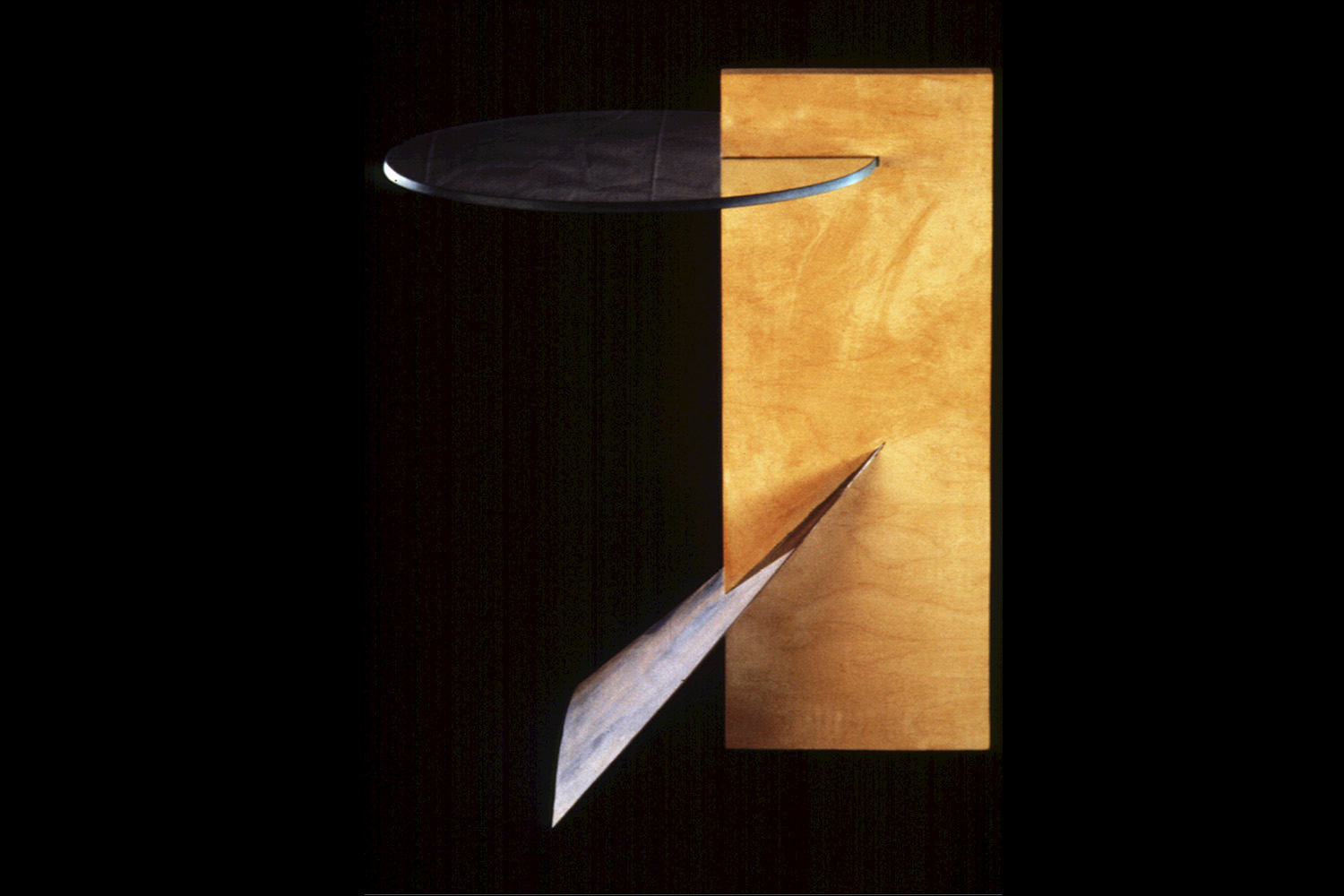
Table (1981)

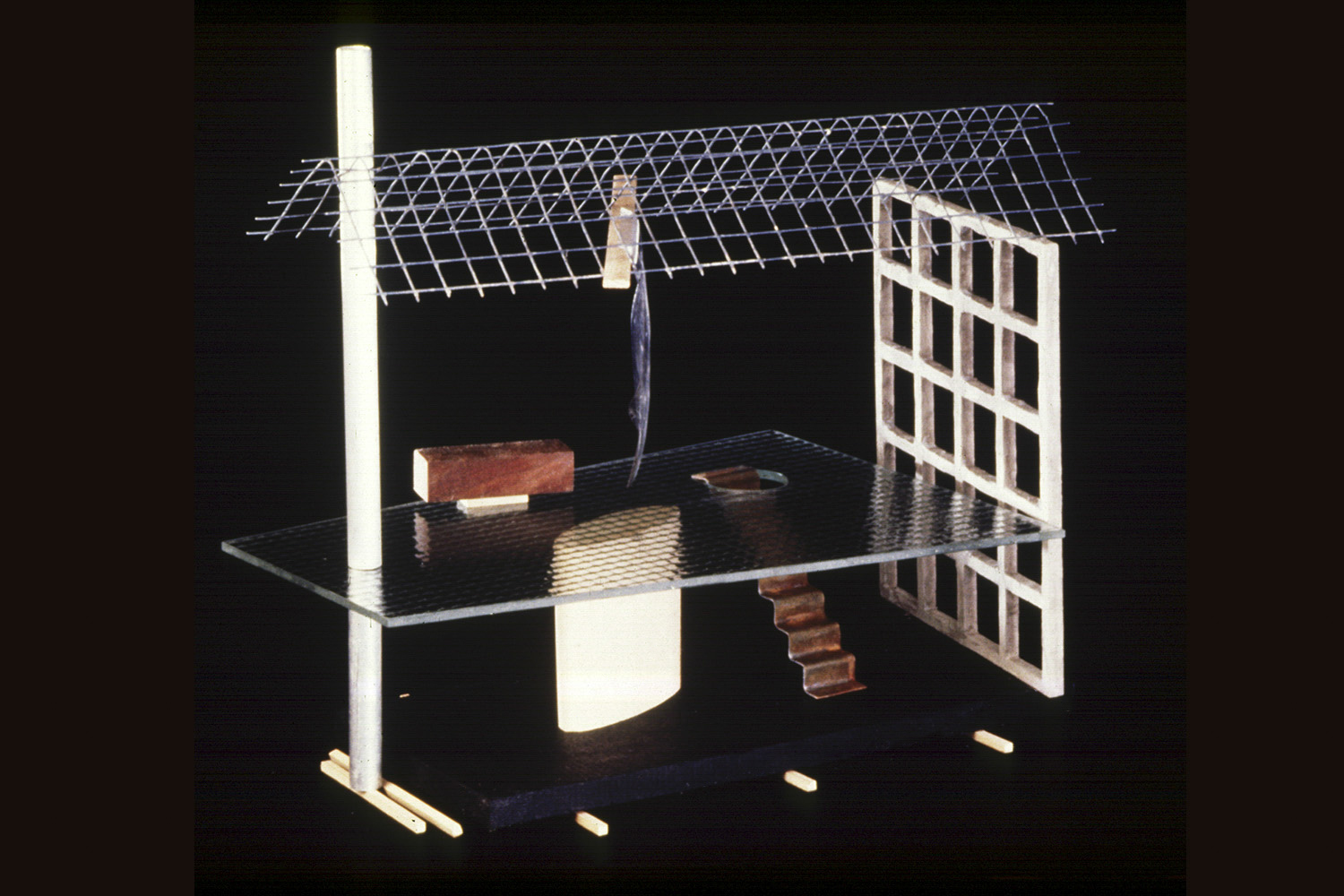
Models (1984)

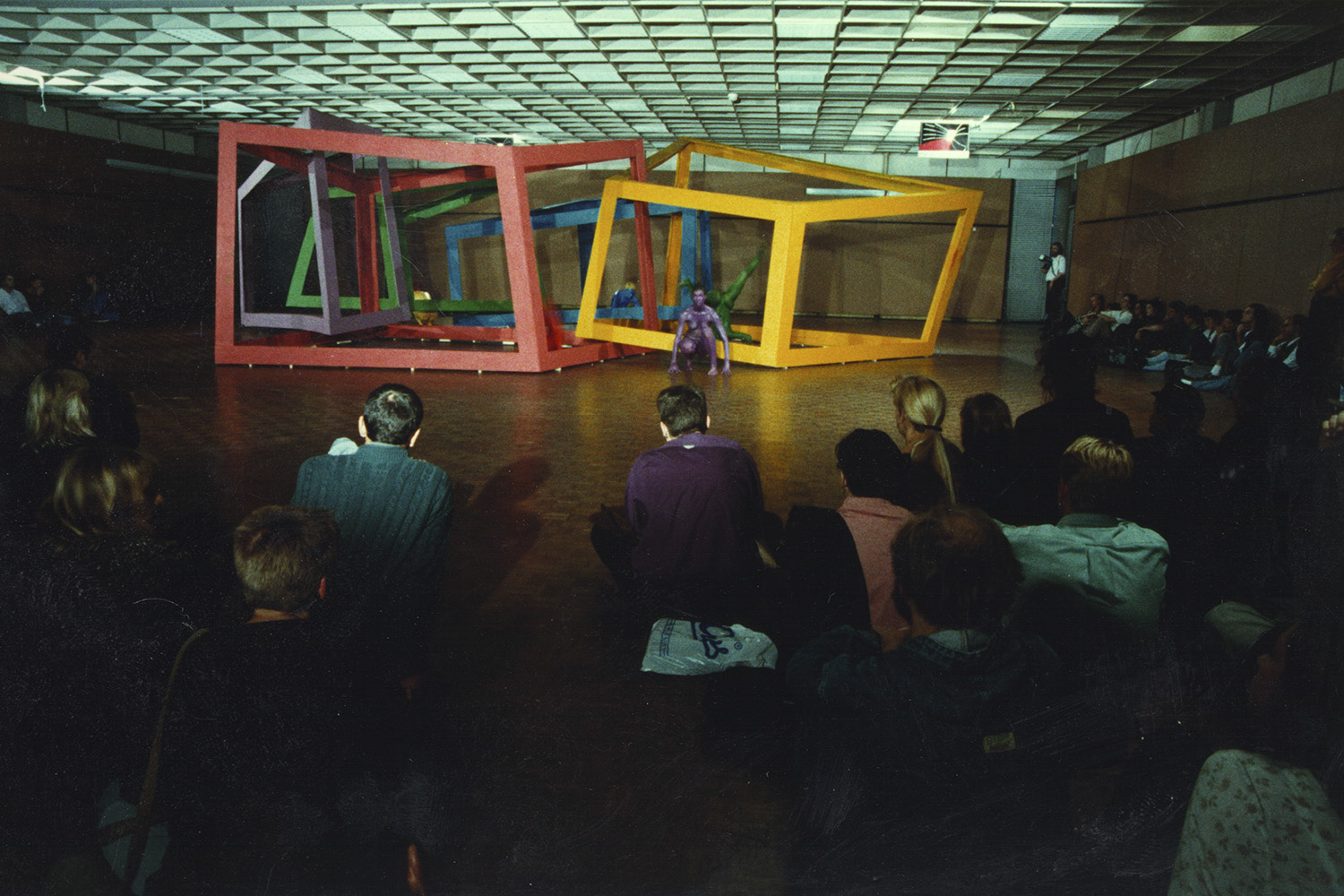
5 Spaces (1991)

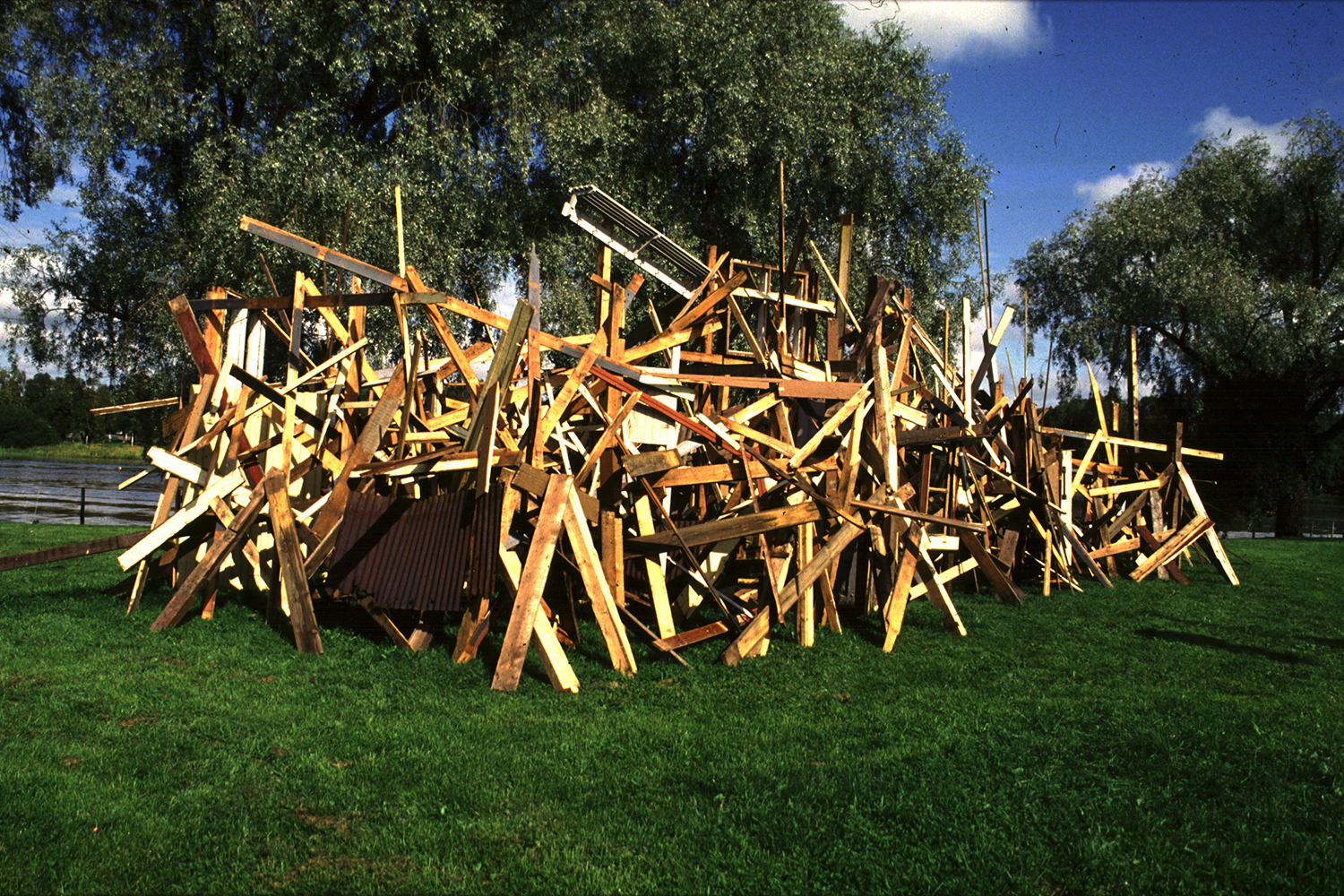
The House Project, Pori Art Museum (Finland, 1993)

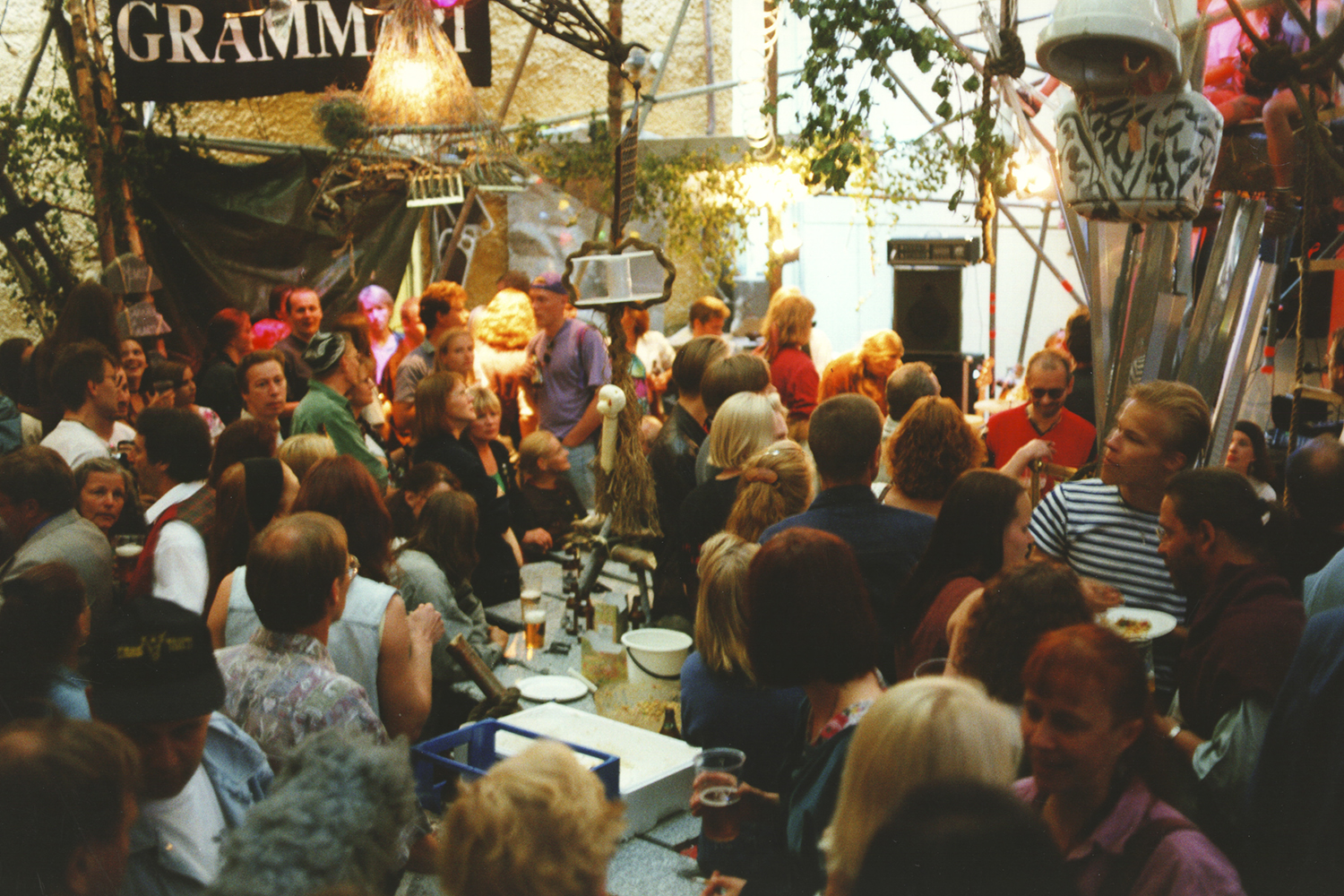
The Magic Restaurant (large team cooperation and Oulu Art Museum, Oulu, 1994)

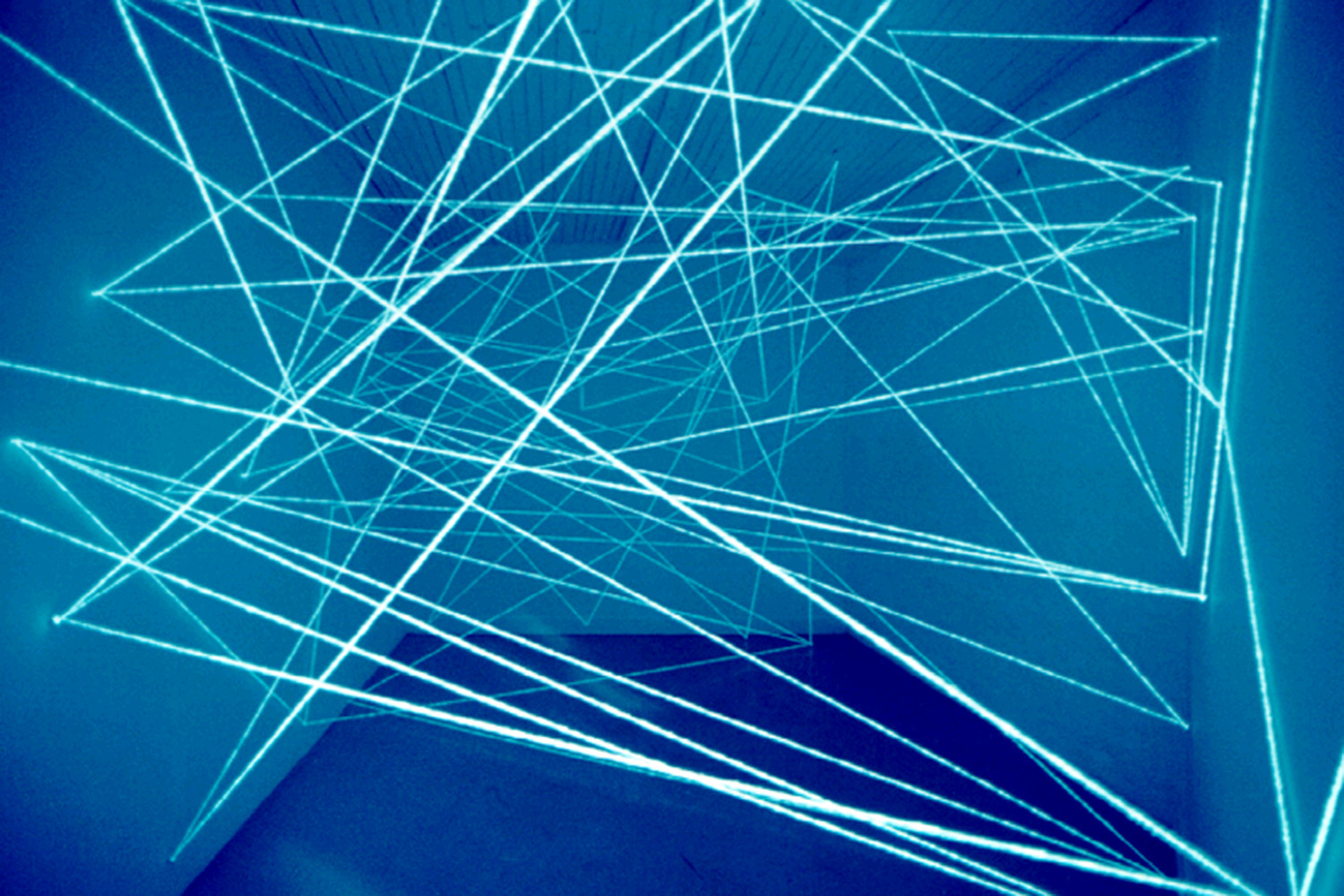
300 Grams of Wool, The Living Art Museum (Nýló) (Reykjavík, 1995)

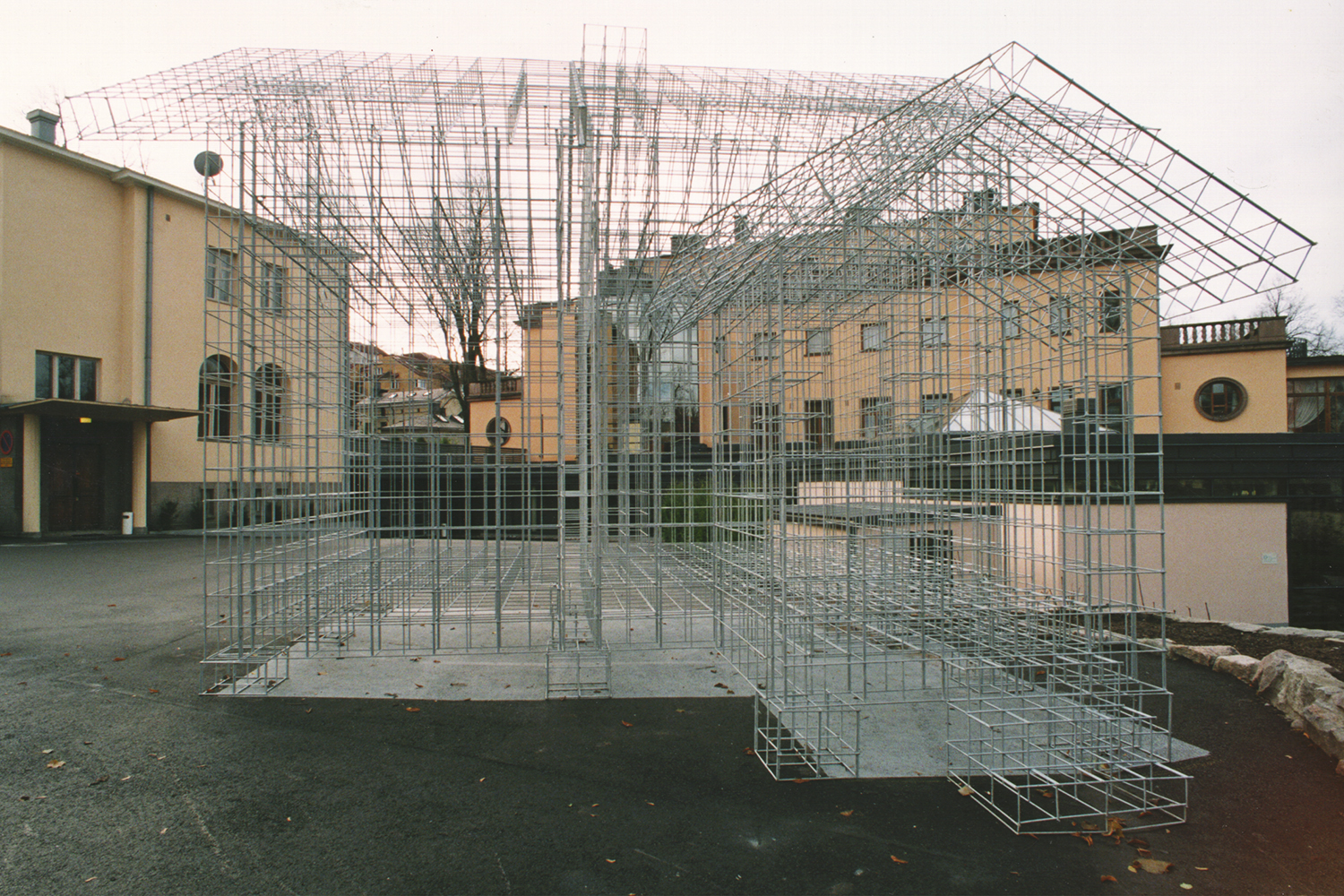
A Transparent Dream, Wäinö Aaltonen and Ars Nova aboa Vetus Museum (Turku, 1996)

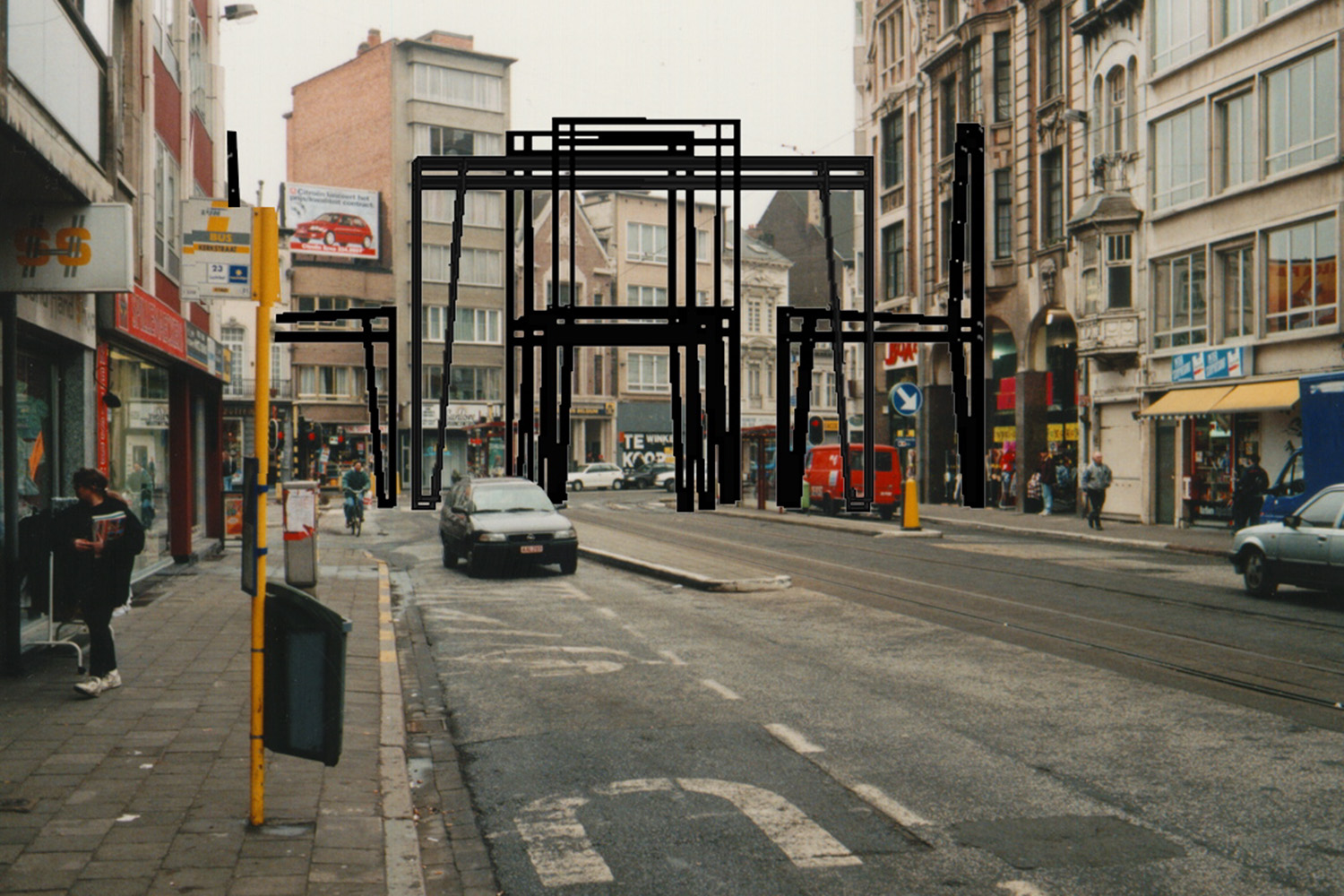
A Table and 4 Chairs, City of Antwerp (not yet realized, Antwerp, 1998)

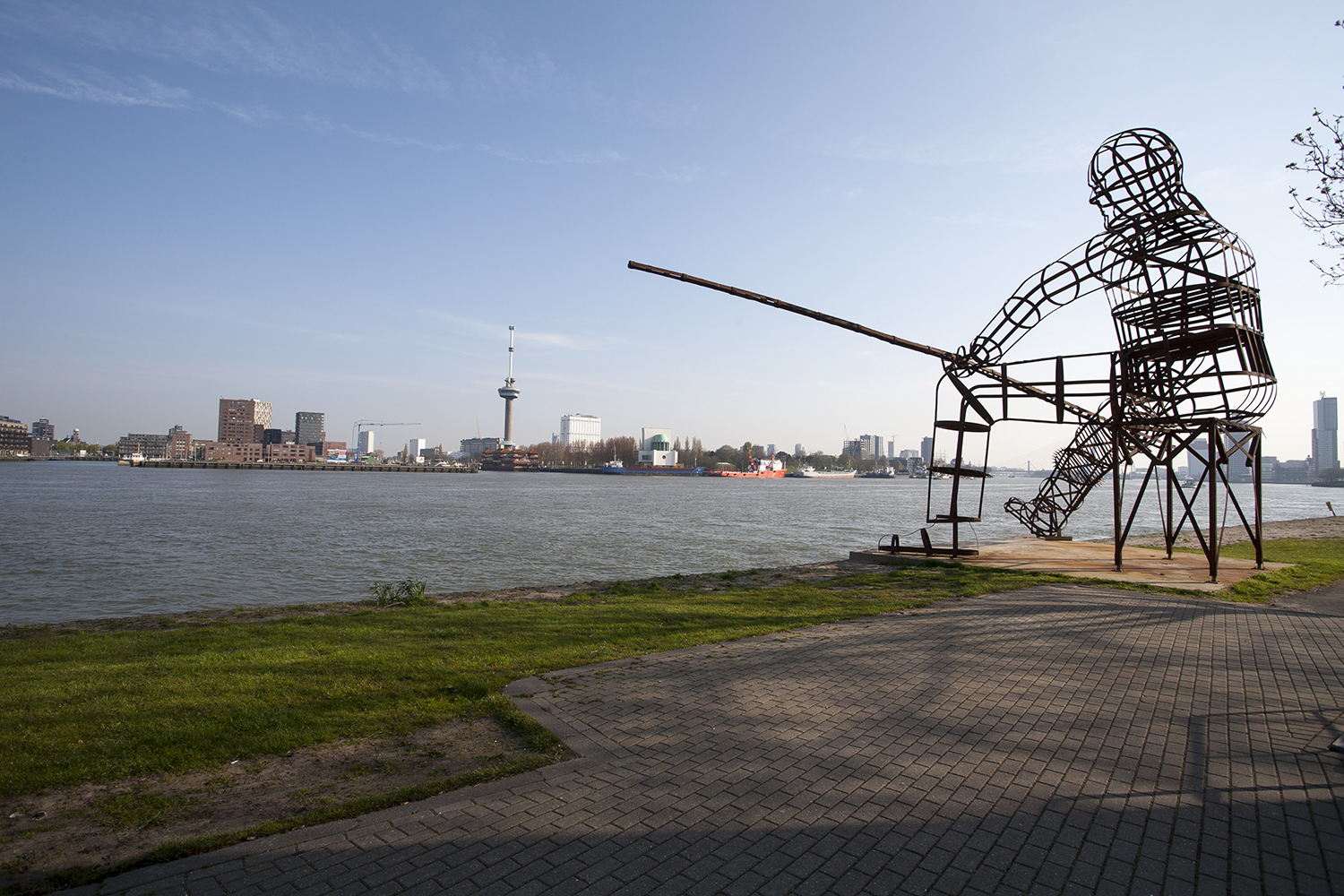
The Fisherman, City of Rotterdam (Rotterdam, 2006)

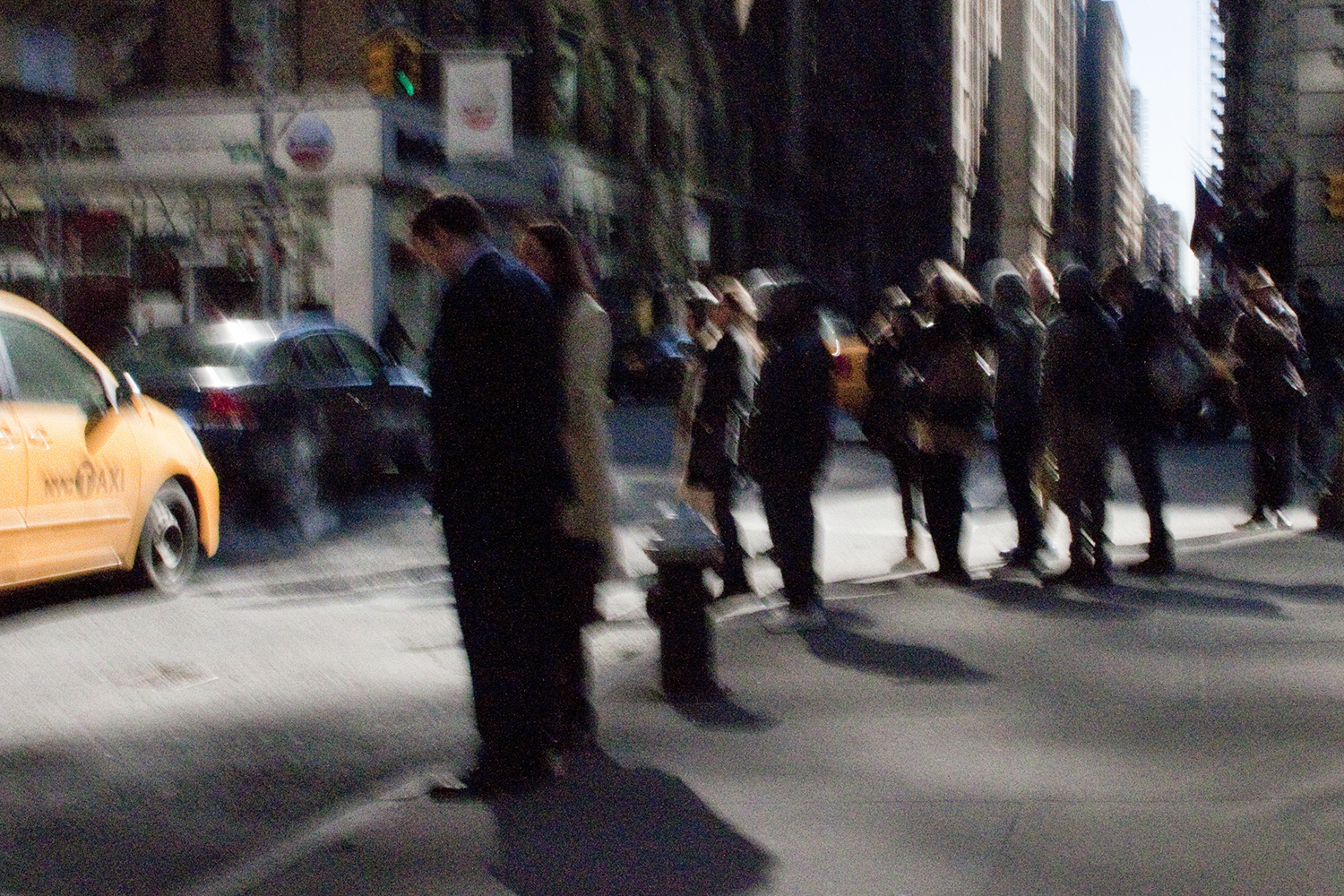
New York (2011)

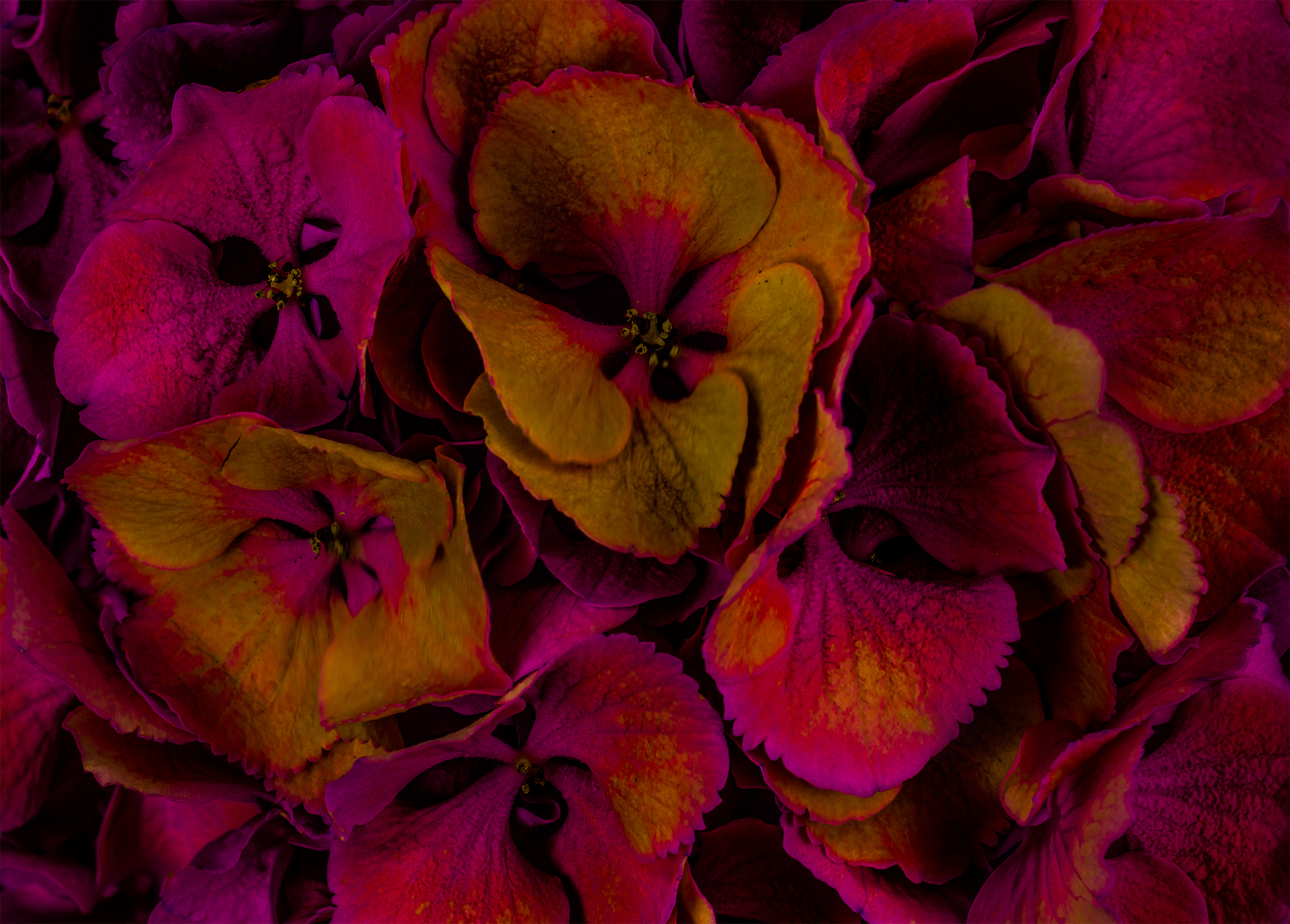
Flowers XS (2012)

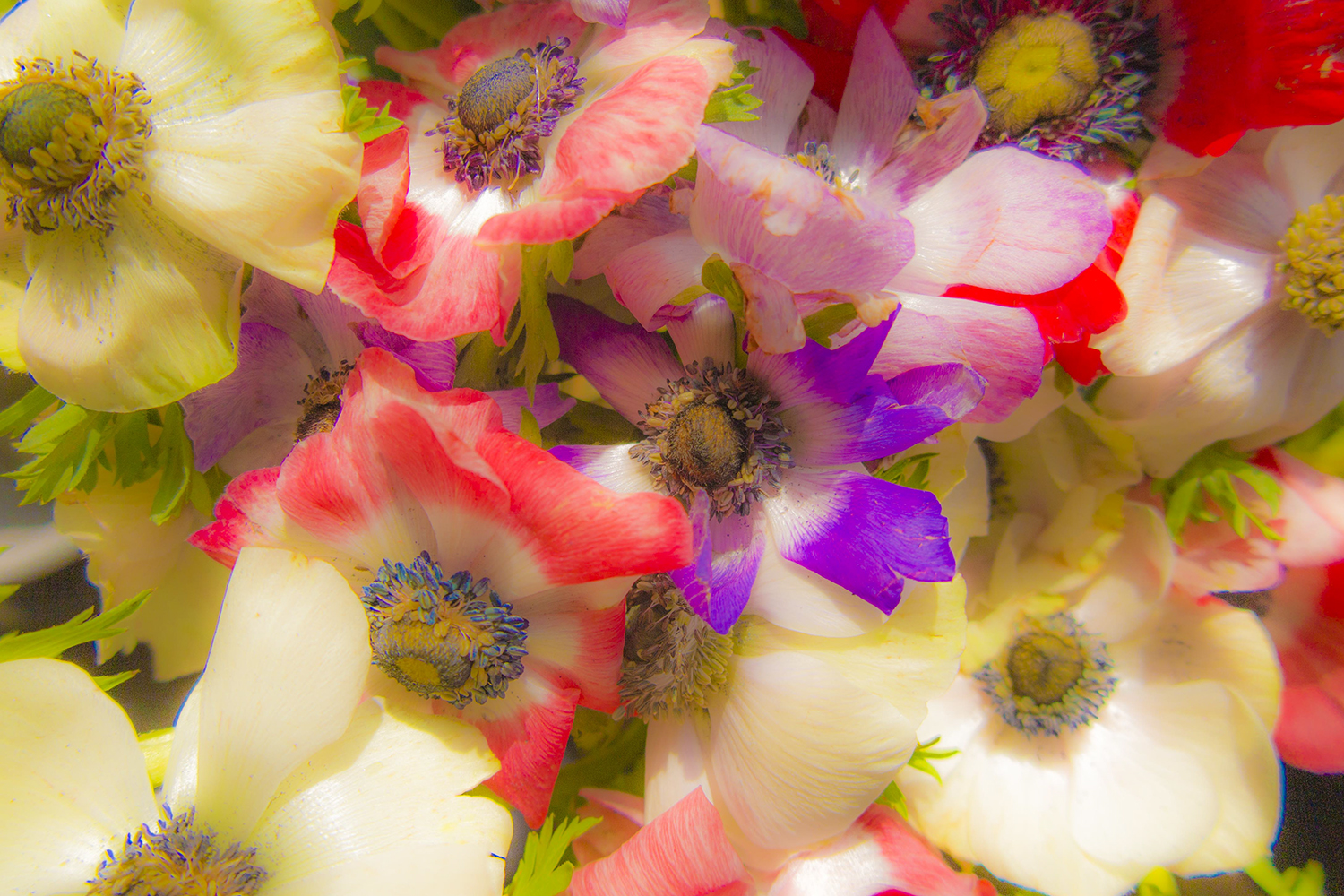
The Anemones (2015)
