= Pessoa Prize =

The Pessoa Prize (Portuguese: Prémio Pessoa, Portuguese pronunciation: [ˌpɾɛmju pɨˈsoɐ]), named after Fernando Pessoa, is recognized as the most important award in the area of Portuguese culture. Created in 1987 by the newspaper Expresso and the IT company Unisys, since 2008 the prize has been sponsored by Caixa Geral de Depósitos. It is granted annually to the Portuguese person who during this period, and in the course of previous activity, has distinguished him or herself as a figure in scientific, artistic, or literary life.

== List of prize winners ==
- 1987 – José Mattoso, historian
- 1988 – António Ramos Rosa, poet
- 1989 – Maria João Pires, pianist
- 1990 – Menez, painter
- 1991 – Cláudio Torres, archaeologist
- 1992 – António Damásio and Hanna Damásio, neurophysiologists
- 1993 – Fernando Gil, philosopher and poet
- 1994 – Herberto Helder, poet – refused the award
- 1995 – Vasco Graça Moura, essayist
- 1996 – João Lobo Antunes, neurosurgeon
- 1997 – José Cardoso Pires, writer
- 1998 – Eduardo Souto de Moura, architect
- 1999 – Manuel Alegre, poet, and José Manuel Rodrigues, photographer
- 2000 – Emmanuel Nunes, composer
- 2001 – João Bénard da Costa, president of the Cinemateca Portuguesa—Museu do Cinema, and a film historian
- 2002 – Manuel Sobrinho Simões, scientist (medicine)
- 2003 – José Gomes Canotilho, constitutionalist
- 2004 – Mário Cláudio, writer
- 2005 – Luís Miguel Cintra, actor and set designer
- 2006 – António Câmara, professor and founder of the YDreams IT firm
- 2007 – Irene Flunser Pimentel, historian
- 2008 – Carrilho da Graça, architect
- 2009 – Manuel Clemente, Catholic Church prelate
- 2010 – Maria do Carmo Fonseca, scientist and Professor of the School of Medicine of Santa Maria
- 2011 – Eduardo Lourenço, essayist
- 2012 – Richard Zenith, writer and translator
- 2013 – Maria Manuel Mota, scientist (biomedicine)
- 2014 – Henrique Leitão, Physicist, Professor and researcher in the field of History of Sciences
- 2015 – Rui Chafes, sculptor
- 2016 – Frederico Lourenço, writer and translator
- 2017 – Manuel Aires Mateus, architect
- 2018 – Miguel Bastos Araújo, scientist (biogeographer)
- 2019 – Tiago Rodrigues, theatre director
- 2020 – Elvira Fortunato, scientist (engineering)
- 2021 - Tiago Pitta e Cunha, jurist specialized in ocean issues
- 2022 – João Luís Barreto Guimarães, poet and plastic surgeon
- 2023 - José Tolentino de Mendonça, poet and prelate of the Catholic Church
- 2024 - Luís Tinoco, composer
- 2025 - Lídia Jorge, writer

== See also ==
- List of general science and technology awards
