= Descartes' Error =

1994 book by Antonio Damasio

Descartes' Error: Emotion, Reason, and the Human Brain
- The original paperback edition
- Author: António Damásio
- Language: English
- Published: 1994
- Pages: 312
- ISBN: 978-0-399-13894-2

Descartes' Error: Emotion, Reason, and the Human Brain is a 1994 book by neuroscientist António Damásio describing the physiology of rational thought and decision, and how the faculties could have evolved through Darwinian natural selection. Damásio refers to René Descartes's separation of the mind from the body (the mind/body dualism) as an error because reasoning requires the guidance of emotions and feelings conveyed from the body. Written for the layperson, Damásio uses the dramatic 1848 railroad accident case of Phineas Gage as a reference for incorporating data from multiple modern clinical cases, enumerating damaging cognitive effects when feelings and reasoning become anatomically decoupled. The book provides an analysis of diverse clinical data contrasting a wide range of emotional changes following frontal lobe damage as well as lower (medulla) and anterior areas of the brain such as the anterior cingulate. Among his experimental evidence and testable hypotheses, Damásio presents the "somatic marker hypothesis", a proposed mechanism by which emotions guide (or bias) behavior and decision-making, and positing that rationality requires emotional input. He argues that René Descartes's "error" was the dualist separation of mind and body, rationality and emotion.

== Publication data ==
- Damásio, António (1994). Descartes' Error: Emotion, Reason, and the Human Brain. Putnam. ISBN 0-399-13894-3.
  - Harper Perennial, 1995 paperback: ISBN 0-380-72647-5
  - Penguin, 2005 paperback reprint: ISBN 0-14-303622-X

== See also ==
- Gerald Edelman
- Oliver Sacks
- Mark Solms
- Triune brain

== Bibliography ==
- Hughes, Tom; Harding, Katharine (2014). "Review: Descartes' error". Practical Neurology. 14 (3): 201. doi:10.1136/practneurol-2014-000899. S2CID 219202774.
- Hyyppä, Markku (October 1996). "Review: Descartes' error". Journal of Psychosomatic Research. 41 (4): 386. doi:10.1016/S0022-3999(96)00093-1.
- Panksepp, Jaak (1998). Affective Neuroscience: The Foundations of Human and Animal Emotions. New York, NY: Oxford University Press. ISBN 978-0-19-517805-0.
- Marg, Elwin (1995). "Review: Descartes' error". Optometry and Vision Science. 72 (11). doi:10.1097/00006324-199511000-00013.
