= Maria Manuel Mota =

Portuguese scientist, researcher, imunologist

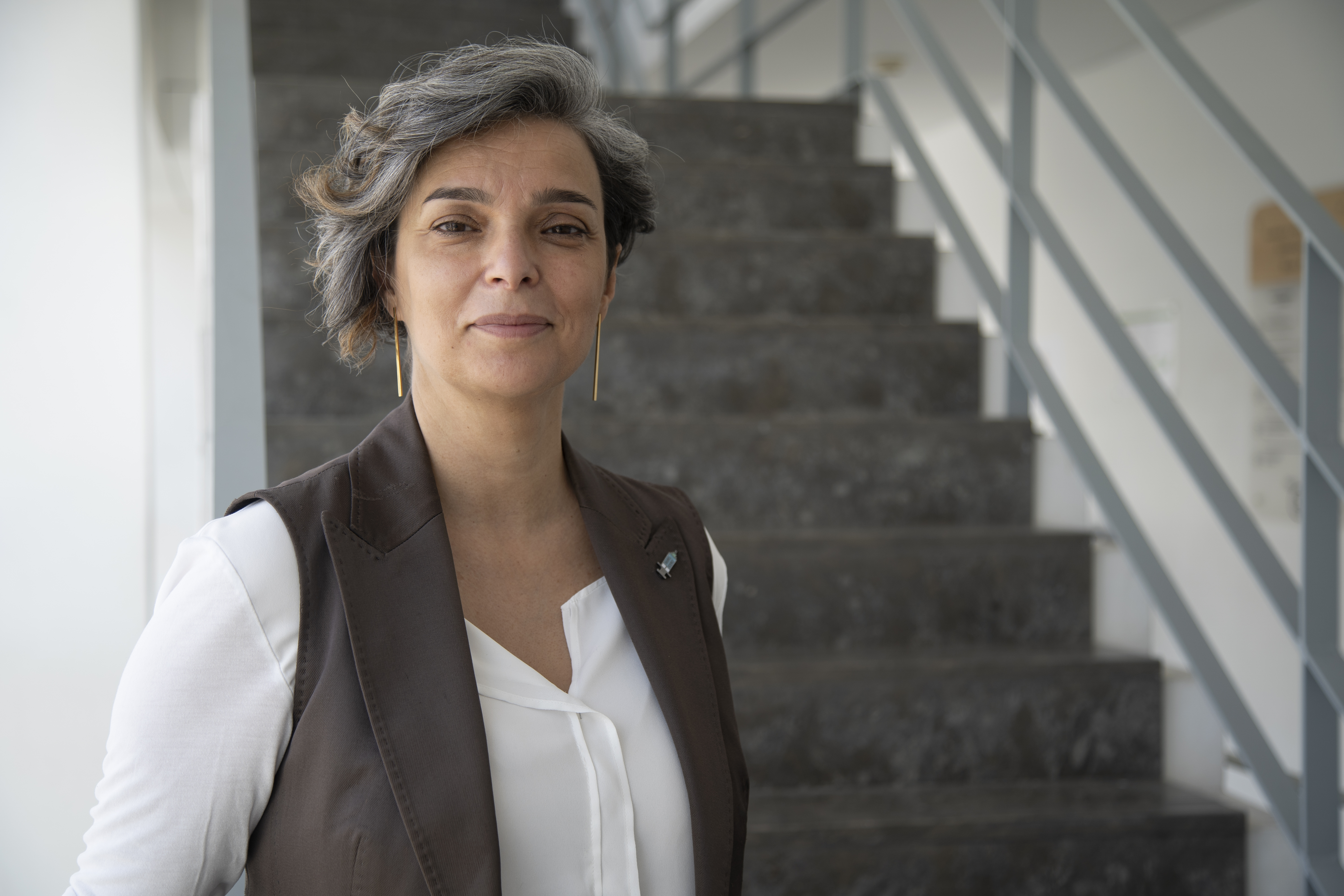
- Born: Vila Nova de Gaia
- Education: University College of London
- Scientific career
- Fields: Malaria; Host-Pathogen Interactions
- Workplaces: NewYork-Presbyterian/Columbia University Medical Center, United States; Instituto Gulbenkian de Ciência, Portugal; Instituo de Medicina Molecular João Lobo Antunes, Portugal
- Thesis: "Sequestration and the infected-erythrocyte surface in Plasmodium chabaudi malaria infection" (1999)
- Website: https://imm.medicina.ulisboa.pt/investigation/laboratories/maria-mota-lab/#intro

Maria Manuel Mota is a Portuguese malariologist and executive director of the Instituto de Medicina Molecular João Lobo Antunes, Lisbon.

== Education ==
Maria Mota, a native of Vila Nova de Gaia, graduated from her undergraduate degree in Biology in 1992 and received her master's degree in immunology in 1994 from the University of Porto. She received her PhD in molecular parasitology in 1998 from University College London, working at the affiliated National Institute for Medical Research with Will Jarra and Anthony Holder.

== Career ==
Mota moved to the United States after her PhD to postdoc at the New York University Medical Center in the lab of Victor Nussenzweig. In 2002 she set up her first research group at Instituto Gulbenkian de Ciência, Oeiras, Portugal. In 2005 Mota was made a professor at the University of Lisbon. She has been executive director at the Instituto de Medicina Molecular João Lobo Antunes (iMM) in Lisbon since 2014, and still leads the Biology and Physiology of Malaria research group.

In 2016 Mota was elected a member of EMBO. She is a visiting professor of immunology and infectious disease at the Harvard T.H. Chan School of Public Health in the lab of Dyann Wirth.

In addition to her career as a researcher, Mota was founder and vice-president of the Portuguese science public outreach organisation Associação Viver a Ciência.

== Research ==
Throughout her career Mota has researched the molecular biology of malaria infection, especially regarding host-pathogen interactions. Although she studies molecular interactions her research has linked these to grander host factors which influence infection, such as nutrition status and circadian rhythms.

Mota was the lead researcher of the first study to demonstrate that malaria parasites, when they enter the liver early in infection, enter and traverse through multiple liver cells before finding a cell that they stay in for replication. This work was based on a serendipitous discovery made from a conversation between Mota and Ana Rodriguez in a lift, about an old film Rodriguez had from a previous research project. The work was another example of collaboration between Victor and Ruth Nussenzweig.

Mota’s research has often investigated the liver stage of malaria, an oft-forgotten stage of the parasite, but an important one since it is the first stage of infection after mosquito bite. Mysteriously immunity to this part of the malaria life cycle is very poor. Mota was involved in a study which showed that this is partially a consequence of the repression of Dendritic cells in the liver, which normally activate T cells and present them with the molecular targets of the infection. However she later showed that the liver does possess an active innate immune system response. Malaria cells further protect themselves from destruction by the liver cells themselves (through Autophagy) by binding the autophagy factor Microtubule-associated protein light chain 3 (LC3). This research opens up a new therapeutic target for malaria drugs.

Mota’s own research group showed that an ongoing blood stage infection inhibits a new malaria liver stage (i.e. repressing superinfection from a later mosquito bite). This works through the action of hepcidin, which is upregulated during malaria infection and diverts iron away from liver cells, starving a new malaria infection of an essential nutrient.

In 2017 Mota’s team published research indicating that malaria parasites are able to sense the nutritional status of their host and correspondingly alter their growth rates. 30% calorie restriction diets of laboratory mice lead to a reduction in growth rate of Plasmodium berghei parasites in the mice blood. A malaria kinase protein, KIN, was found to be involved in sensing host nutritional status, as when it was genetically knocked-out of the parasites they did not respond to host calorie restriction. These results match evidence from human infections, as doctors had noticed that malaria infections sometimes get more severe after hospitalisation and improved feeding of malnourished patients.

== Awards ==
In 2003 Mota was given a Young Investigator Award by EMBO. More funding came from a European Science Foundation Young Investigator award in 2004.

In 2005 Mota was appointed Commander of the Order of Prince Henry (Comendadora da Ordem do Infante D. Henrique), a national honour of Portugal.

She was honored with the Prémio Pessoa Prize in 2013, given to Portuguese citizens who contribute significantly to the arts or sciences. Mota is one of the youngest recipients of the prestigious award.

In November 2017 she was awarded the Pfizer Prize for her work in the area of malaria.

In November 2018 she received the mid-career Sanofi-Institut Pasteur prize, worth 150 thousand euros.
