= Convergence-divergence zone =

The theory of convergence-divergence zones was proposed by Antonio Damasio, in 1989, to explain the neural mechanisms of recollection. It also helps to explain other forms of consciousness: creative imagination, thought, the formation of beliefs and motivations ...

It is based on two key assumptions: 1) Imagination is a simulation of perception. 2) Brain registrations of memories are self-excitatory neural networks (neurons can activate each other).

== Definition ==
A convergence-divergence zone (CDZ) is a neural network which receives convergent projections from the sites whose activity is to be recorded, and which returns divergent projections to the same sites. When an experiment is recorded, the signals that converge on the CDZ excite their neurons which strengthen their mutual connections (according to the Hebbian theory) and thus form a self-excitatory network. The excitation of this network is then enough to reproduce the combination of initially received signals. In a self-excitatory network the excitation of a part spreads to all the others, just like a memory fragment awakens an entire recorded experience. A CDZ is thus the place of recording and reproduction of memories. It is both a detector and a signal producer (forms of neuronal activation). This is the basic neural mechanism that explains memories and other forms of imagination.

== Arborescences of CDZ ==
In addition to convergent-divergent paths, a CDZ may be connected to the rest of the brain in every imaginable way, by input signals that activate or inhibit it, and output signals with which it influences the rest of the system. In particular CDZs may be organized into a system and form an arborescence. A CDZ may recruit converging input channels from many other CDZs. It can thus make a synthesis of detection and production capabilities of all the CDZs thus recruited.

To make a model of the CDZ system, we distinguish in the nervous system a peripheral part and a central one, with a gradual progression from the periphery to the center. The periphery includes all sources of perception: the feeling of the outside and inside, emotions and actions. The periphery, thus understood, includes all cortical sensory, emotional and motor areas, and all intracerebral nuclei that contribute to their functioning.

The CDZ system is organized in a hierarchical fashion, from the periphery to the center. The most peripheral CDZs have convergent paths directly from the periphery. We approach the center going up the arborescence of CDZs. One can think of roots that plunge into the earth, the periphery, and converge to the base of the trunk, the center. But in the brain, there are a large number of centers. The most central CDZs have converging projections from other CDZs, and are not recruited by a more central CDZ. The memory of an episode of our life is preserved in such central CDZs. When we relive the perceptions, emotions and actions of a past experience, the excitation of this central CDZs activates all subordinated CDZs and the peripheral areas. It thereby reconstructs the previously lived experience.

== See also ==
- Memory
- Episodic memory
