= Damasio's theory of consciousness =

Concept developed by neuroscientist Antonio Damasio

Developed in his 1999 book, The Feeling of What Happens, Antonio Damasio's theory of consciousness proposes that consciousness arises from the interactions between the brain, the body, and the environment. According to this theory, consciousness is not a unitary experience, but rather emerges from the dynamic interplay between different brain regions and their corresponding bodily states. Damasio argues that our conscious experiences are influenced by the emotional responses that are generated by our body's interactions with the environment, and that these emotional responses play a crucial role in shaping our conscious experience. This theory emphasizes the importance of the body and its physiological processes in the emergence of consciousness.

Damasio's three layered theory is based on a hierarchy of stages, with each stage building upon the last. The most basic representation of the organism is referred to as the Protoself, Core Consciousness, and Extended Consciousness. Damasio's approach to explaining the development of consciousness relies on three notions: emotion, feeling, and feeling a feeling. Emotions are a collection of unconscious neural responses that give rise to feelings. Emotions are complex reactions to stimuli that cause observable external changes in the organism. A feeling arises when the organism becomes aware of the changes it is experiencing as a result of external or internal stimuli. Antonio Damasio's work on consciousness:

1. Holistic Approach: Damasio argues that consciousness isn't just a brain function but involves the entire body. He suggests that the brain works in tandem with older biological systems like the endocrine and immune systems, emphasizing a holistic view of consciousness.
2. Homeostasis as Central: Damasio's theory places homeostasis at the core of consciousness, proposing that consciousness evolved to help organisms maintain internal stability, which is crucial for survival.
3. Microbiome Influence: Damasio highlights the role of the gut microbiome in influencing brain function and emotional states, suggesting that our consciousness is affected by the microbial environment within our bodies.
4. Dual Mind Registers: He distinguishes between two mental registers: one for cognitive functions like reasoning, and another for emotions and feelings, which are tied to the body's state.

== Protoself ==
According to Damasio's theory of consciousness, the protoself is the first stage in the hierarchical process of consciousness generation. Shared by many species, the protoself is the most basic representation of the organism, and it arises from the brain's constant interaction with the body. The protoself is an unconscious process that creates a "map" of the body's physiological state, which is then used by the brain to generate conscious experience. This "map" is constantly updated as the brain receives new stimuli from the body, and it forms the foundation for the development of more complex forms of consciousness.

Damasio asserts that the protoself is signified by a collection of neural patterns that are representative of the body's internal state. The function of this "self" is to constantly detect and record, moment by moment, the internal physical changes that affect the homeostasis of the organism. Protoself does not represent a traditional sense of self; rather, it is a pre-conscious state, which provides a reference for the core self and autobiographical self to build from. As Damasio puts it, "Protoself is a coherent collection of neural patterns, which map moment-by-moment the state of the physical structure of the organism" (Damasio 1999).

Multiple brain areas are required for the protoself to function. Namely, the hypothalamus, which controls the general homeostasis of the organism, the brain stem, whose nuclei map body signals, and the insular cortex, whose function is linked to emotion. These brain areas work together to keep up with the constant process of collecting neural patterns to map the current status of the body's responses to environmental changes. The protoself does not require language in order to function; moreover, it is a direct report of one's experience. In this state, emotion begins to manifest itself as second-order neural patterns located in subcortical areas of the brain. Emotion acts as a neural object, from which a physical reaction can be drawn. This reaction causes the organism to become aware of the changes that are affecting it. From this realization, springs Damasio's notion of “feeling”. This occurs when the patterns contributing to emotion manifest as mental images, or brain movies. When the body is modified by these neural objects, the second layer of self emerges. This is known as core consciousness.

== Core consciousness ==
Sufficiently more evolved is the second layer of Damasio's theory, Core Consciousness. This emergent process occurs when an organism becomes consciously aware of feelings associated with changes occurring to its internal bodily state; it is able to recognize that its thoughts are its own, and that they are formulated in its own perspective. It develops a momentary sense of self, as the brain continuously builds representative images, based on communications received from the Protoself. This level of consciousness is not exclusive to human beings and remains consistent and stable throughout the lifetime of the organism The image is a result of mental patterns which are caused by an interaction with internal or external stimulus. A relationship is established, between the organism and the object it is observing as the brain continuously creates images to represent the organism's experience of qualia.

Damasio's definition of emotion is that of an unconscious reaction to any internal or external stimulus which activates neural patterns in the brain. "Feeling" emerges as a still unconscious state which simply senses the changes affecting the Protoself due to the emotional state. These patterns develop into mental images, which then float into the organism's awareness. Put simply, consciousness is the feeling of knowing a feeling. When the organism becomes aware of the feeling that its bodily state (Protoself) is being affected by its experiences, or response to emotion, Core Consciousness is born. The brain continues to present nonverbal narrative sequence of images in the mind of the organism, based on its relationship to objects. An object in this context can be anything from a person, to a melody, to a neural image. Core consciousness is concerned only with the present moment, here and now. It does not require language or memory, nor can it reflect on past experiences or project itself into the future.

== Extended consciousness ==
When consciousness moves beyond the here and now, Damasio's third and final layer emerges as Extended Consciousness. This level could not exist without its predecessors, and, unlike them, requires a vast use of conventional memory. Therefore, an injury to a person's memory center can cause damage to their extended consciousness, without hurting the other layers. The autobiographical self draws on memory of past experiences which involves use of higher thought. This autobiographical layer of self is developed gradually over time. Working memory is necessary for an extensive display of items to be recalled and referenced. Linguistic areas of the brain are activated to enhance the organism's experience, however, according to the language of thought hypothesis, language would not be necessarily required.

== Criticism ==
Damasio's theory of consciousness has been met with criticism for its lack of explanation regarding the generation of conscious experiences by the brain. Researchers have posited that the brain's interaction with the body alone cannot account for the complexity of conscious experience, and that additional factors must be considered. Furthermore, the theory has been criticized for its inadequate treatment of the concept of self-awareness and its lack of a clear method of measuring consciousness, which hinders empirical testing and evaluation.

=== Formalistic elements ===
Theories of emotion currently fall into four main categories which follow one another in a historical series: evolutionary (ethological), physiological, neurological, and cognitive.

1. Evolutionary theories derive from Darwin's 'Emotions in man and the animals'.
2. Physiological theories suggest that responses within the body are responsible for emotions.
3. Neurological theories propose that activity within the brain leads to emotional responses.
4. Cognitive theories argue that thoughts and other mental activity play an essential role in forming emotions.

Note that no current theory of emotion falls strictly within a single category, rather each theory uses one approach to form its core premises from which it is then able to extend its main postulates.

Damasio's tri-level view of the human mind, which posits that we share the two lowest levels with other animals, has been suggested before. For example, see Dyer ( www.conscious-computation.webnode.com ).

Dyer's triune expansion is compared to Damasio's:

1. Sensorimotor stage (cf. Damasio's Protoself)
2. Spatiotemporal stage (Core-Consciousness)
3. Cognolinguistic stage (Extended Consciousness)

An important feature of Damasio's theory (one that it shares with Dyer's theory) is the key role played by mental images, consciously mediating the information exchange between endocrine and cognitive.

Ledoux and Brown have a different view of how emotion is connected to general cognition. They place emotionality on a similar level as that of other cognitive states. (In fairness, both Dyer's and Damasio's models concur on this point, i.e. that emotionality is not isolated to a particular layer within the tri-level framework).

Earlier less sophisticated models placed the emotions strictly within the Limbic circuits, where their primary role was to consciously respond to, as well as cause responses within, the hypothalamus, the interface between intentional mind states and metabolic (endocrine) body states.

Emotionality is demonstrably a global mind state, just like consciousness. For example, we can be simultaneously aware of (low-level) a pain (low-level) in our body, and an idea (high level) that enters our imagination (working memory). Likewise, our (low-level) emotional reaction to a painful workplace injury (fear, threat to well-being) can coexist with our (high-level) feeling of anger and indignation at the co-worker who failed to follow safety guidelines.

=== Substantive process ===
A careful reading of Damasio's work reveals that he distinguishes his theories from those of his predecessors, in how the formalistic elements interact with each other in a dynamically integrated system. E.g, the suggestion of a dynamic neural map ultimately posits that we are the instantaneous configuration of a neural state in the present moment, rather than the supporting biological construct. I.e., our conscious identity is the software, not the hardware, even though our unique hardware constrains how we operate as the software.

=== Need for consciousness and qualia ===
A common criticism stems from the fact that both knowing and feeling can be processed with equal success without conscious awareness, as machines, for instance, do, and those models do not explain the need for consciousness and qualia.
