= Irene Flunser Pimentel =

Portuguese historian of the 20th century

- Born: 2 May 1950; Lisbon, Portugal
- Occupation: Historian
- Notable work: History of Women’s Organizations of the Estado Novo
- Awards: Chevalière of the Legion of Honour of France.

Irene Flunser Pimentel (born May 2, 1950) is a Portuguese historian who concentrates on the study of the 20th century in Portugal, particularly during the time of the Estado Novo regime, with particular reference to the experiences of women.

== Early life ==
Irene Flunser Pimentel was born in the Portuguese capital of Lisbon on 2 May 1950. She came from a wealthy family and attended the Lycée français Charles Lepierre, the French-language school in Lisbon, also spending some time at a school in Switzerland. Her mother was Swiss and her father ran a pharmaceutical company. Beginning university studies at the age of 30, she obtained a degree in history from the Faculty of Letters of the University of Lisbon, a master's in contemporary history from the Faculty of Social and Human Sciences of NOVA University Lisbon in 1997 and a doctorate in institutional history and politics of the 20th Century, in 2007 from the same university.

== Politics ==
Pimentel was politically active until 1978. She had Marxist-Leninist views. After leaving school she spent a year in Paris, together with the large number of Portuguese Communist Party (PCP) and other Portuguese exiles. After the April 1974 Carnation Revolution, which overthrew the Estado Novo, she worked with the Communist Electoral Front (Marxist–Leninist), which participated in the elections for the Constituent Assembly that drafted Portugal's new constitution.

== Academic career ==
Pimentel is a researcher at the Institute of Contemporary History of NOVA University. She worked on a project entitled "Political Justice in the Transition to Democracy in Portugal" until 2012. This was followed from 2013 to 2018 by a project called "The political justice process in relation to PIDE/DGS, in the transition to democracy in Portugal". The PIDE was the Polícia Internacional e de Defesa do Estado, or secret police of the Estado Novo, which became the Directorate-General of Security (DGS) in 1968, being disbanded in 1974. Her other research interests include the Second World War in neutral Portugal; Portugal and refugees; Portugal and the Holocaust; and Portuguese colonial prisons and concentration camps.

== Publications ==
Pimentel is the author and co-author of the following publications, among others:

- História das Organizações Femininas do Estado Novo (History of Women's Organizations of the Estado Novo - 2000)
- Judeus em Portugal durante a Segunda Guerra Mundial. Em fuga a Hitler e ao Holocausto (Jews in Portugal during World War II. Fleeing Hitler and the Holocaust - 2006)
- Vítimas de Salazar. Estado Novo e Violência Política (co-authored with João Madeira and Luís Farinha) (Victims of Salazar. The Estado Novo and Political Violence - 2007)
- A PIDE/DGS 1945-1974 (2007)
- Cardeal Cerejeira. O Príncipe da Igreja (Cardinal Cerejeira. The Prince of the Church - 2010)
- A Cada Um o Seu Lugar. A política feminina do Estado Novo (To Each Her Place. The female policy of the Estado Novo - 2011)
- Salazar, Portugal e o Holocausto (co-authored with Cláudia Ninhos) (2012)
- Espiões em Portugal Durante a II Guerra Mundial (Spies in Portugal during WW2 - 2013)
- História da Oposição à Ditadura (1926-1974) (History of Opposition to the Dictatorship - 2014)
- O caso da PIDE/DGS (The Case of PIDE/DGS - 2017)
- Informadores da PIDE – A Tragédia Portuguesa (PIDE Informants - A Portuguese Tragedy - 2022)

== Awards and honours ==
Pimentel has received a number of important awards and honours. They include:

- 1999. Carolina Michaëlis prize. This is awarded by the Comissão para a Igualdade e para os Direitos das Mulheres (Commission for Equality and for the Rights of Women - CIDM).
- 2007. Pessoa Prize. This is awarded annually to one person who has distinguished him or herself as a figure in scientific, artistic, or literary life.
- 2008 and 2012. Máxima de Literatura prize.
- 2009. Seeds of Science prize, in the Social Sciences category.
- 2015. Chevalière of the Legion of Honour, France.
