= Fronteiras do Pensamento =

Brazilian cultural project

Fronteiras do Pensamento (Portuguese: Frontiers of Thought) is a Brazilian cultural project that promotes conferences featuring internationally known intellectuals in order to discuss issues of contemporaneity. Scientific discovery, social research, sustainable solutions, philosophical theses, influences on the ways of understanding and interpreting the world, social/political leadership and activism, are a few of the issues discussed during Frontiers of Thought's annual conference seasons. The project's online content is freely available worldwide, and offers hundreds of videos, subtitled in Portuguese, Spanish and English, as well as articles, news and interviews.

== History ==
Fronteiras do Pensamento is a cultural project conceived in 2006, in the city of Porto Alegre, Brazil. In 2007, during its sixth edition, Christopher Hitchens, Jorge Castañeda, Luc Ferry, Michel Maffesoli and Michel Houellebecq – among others – spoke on the stage of the Salão de Atos in the Federal University of Rio Grande do Sul (UFRGS) giving the project international projection. In 2008, the second edition featured 25 lecturers. Edgar Morin, David Lynch, Philip Glass and Wim Wenders were among them. During that year, the project also took place at the city of Salvador, Brazil. In 2009, lectures featured Eric Maskin, Howard Gardner, Steven Pinker and Tom Wolfe and, in 2010, Carlo Ginzburg, Daniel Dennett, Daniel Cohn-Bendit and Mario Vargas Llosa, who spoke only a few days after being awarded the Nobel Literature Prize. Until 2011, Frontiers of Thought had already featured 98 internationally known guests. During that year, seasons extended to the city of São Paulo. The special season kept taking place in Salvador and, now, in Florianópolis. In 2011, Edgar Morin and Luc Ferry returned to Frontiers of Thought's stage, with them, Fredric Jameson, Garry Kasparov, Mohsen Makhmalbaf, Orhan Pamuk and Shirin Ebadi.

Among the 2012 edition lecturers were the Nobel Peace Prize Mohamed ElBaradei, from Egypt, and Nobel Economy Prize Winner Amartya Sen, from India. Also, Mozambican writer Mia Couto, Colombian urbanist Enrique Peñalosa and British philosopher Simon Blackburn, among others such as Vandana Shiva and Susan Greenfield.

In 2013, under the theme "Ideas make a difference", the project had 24 guests. Among them, Portuguese neuroscientist António Damásio, Nobel Peace Prize winner José Ramos-Horta and the Spanish sociologist Manuel Castells.

In 2014, discussing the theme "The reinvention of the world", Frontiers of Thought invited Salman Rushdie, Gro Brundtland, Brian Greene, Michael Sandel, and others.

The 2015 edition features the theme "How to live together", and guests Richard Dawkins, Jimmy Wales, Fernando Savater, John Gray, Saskia Sassen, Richard Sennett, Valter Hugo Mãe, Suzana Herculano-Houzel, Janette Sadik-Khan, Ferreira Gullar, Camille Paglia, Joseph Stiglitz, Contardo Calligaris, Luc Ferry, Manuel Castells, Pierre Lévy and John Elkington, touring the four cities that host the project – not all cities will have the same lecturers.

== Formats ==
Fronteiras do Pensamento has two different formats: annual seasons and special series. The annual seasons take place in Porto Alegre and São Paulo, Brazil, during the whole year. In both cities, the audience buys tickets for all lectures. The special series take place in Florianópolis and Salvador, in specific times, and tickets can be bought for a single event.
