= José Manuel Rodrigues (photographer) =

Photographer and visual artist (born 1951)

José M. Rodrigues
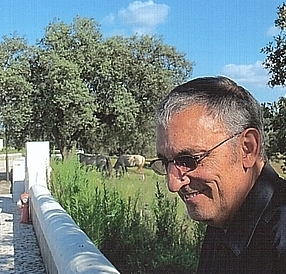
- Rodrigues in Portugal in 2013
- Born: José Manuel dos Santos Rodrigues; 4 May 1951 (age 75); Lisbon, Portugal
- Occupations: Photographer; Visual artist; professor
- Website: www.josemrodrigues.com

José M. Rodrigues, born as José Manuel dos Santos Rodrigues (Lisbon, 4 May 1951), is a contemporary Portuguese-Dutch photographer and visual artist. He lives and works since 1993 in Évora, Portugal, after more than twenty years living and working in the Netherlands.

== Life and work ==
Born in Portugal and raised in turbulent times under the rule of António de Oliveira Salazar, Rodrigues fled abroad in 1968 when all the men had to fight in the army to retain Angola and Moçambique as colonies of Portugal.He lived in Paris, France, in 1968/1969, and in the Netherlands between 1969 and 1993. He studied photography in the Netherlands, in The Hague (1975–80) and in Apeldoorn (1975–1979), at De School voor Fotografie, and took a video course at the Santbergen Institute in Hilversum (1989). Rodrigues has two children (born 1975 and 1979).

Rodrigues was the co-founder of Perspektief – Art Foundation, and responsible for programming the exhibitions of the gallery. He was a member of the GKF, the present DuPho, and the Amsterdam Arts Council between 1987 and 1992.

Rodrigues taught photography at several institutions and national and foreign schools (Rotterdam, Porto, Évora, Caldas de Rainha). In 2007 and 2008 he was visiting professor at the Master in Visual Arts from the IADE in Lisbon. Since 2009 he is the invited assistant professor in the Department of Visual Arts at the University of Évora. In addition, he often has exhibitions and gives many lectures by invitation.

== Awards ==
- 1982: Vrije Creatieve Opdracht prize (Award of Creative Photography), Amsterdamse Kunstraad (Amsterdam Arts Council)
- 1999: Prémio Pessoa (Pessoa Prize) for his whole artistic work and for his contribution to the arts in Portugal)

== Collections ==
Rodrigues' work is held in the following public collections.:

- Serralves Museum, Porto, Portugal
- Portuguese Centre of Photography
- Visual Arts Center
- Dutch Art Foundation
- La Bibliothèque nationale de France, Paris

== Awards ==
- Photography award for de Vrije Creatieve Opdracht (Award of Creative Photography) assigned by Het Amsterdams Fonds voor de Kunst (Council for the Arts, Amsterdam) (1982)
- Prémio Pessoa (Pessoa Prize) assigned by the paper Expresso (Portugal) and the company Unisys, together with the poet Manuel Alegre (1999)
