= Brain and Creativity Institute =

South Carolina university department

Brain and Creativity Institute (BCI) is a research unit of the College of Letters, Arts and Sciences at the University of Southern California, which aims to "gather new knowledge about the human emotions, decision-making, memory, and communication, from a neurological perspective, and to apply this knowledge to the solution of problems in the biomedical and sociocultural arenas." The Institute was founded in August 2006, when Antonio Damasio, Hanna Damasio and colleagues moved from the University of Iowa to the University of Southern California.

In 2016, researchers at the institute studied brain imaging data, and concluded that music training accelerates brain development in children. The results were published in Developmental Cognitive Neuroscience.
