= Spaak family =

European family from the 17th century

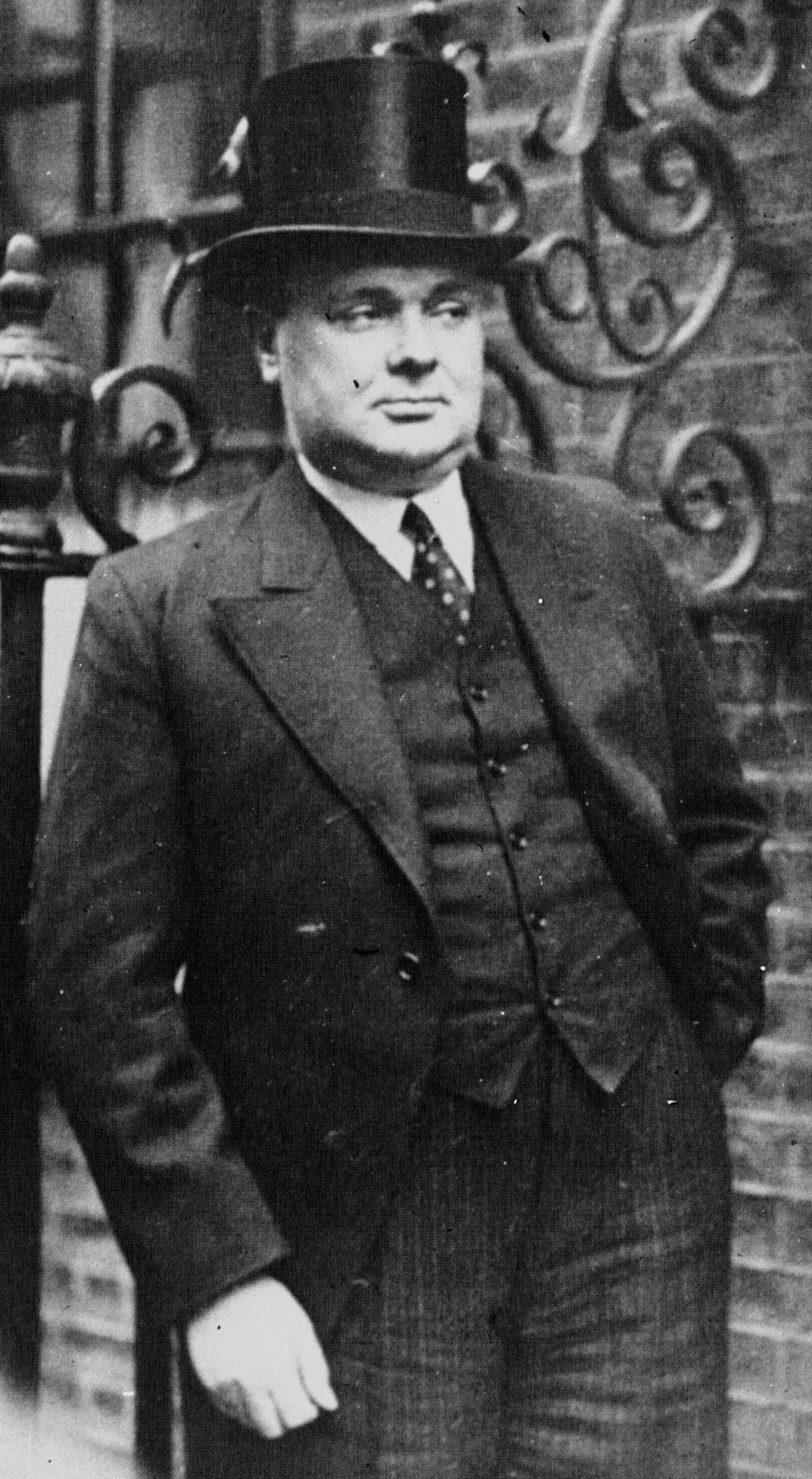
Paul-Henri Spaak (1899–1972), Belgian statesman and one of the founding fathers of the European Union (1937)

Spaak is a family originating in Bohuslän, Sweden, with notable branches in Belgium, France, and Italy.

Elias Jonæ Spaak (1650–1728), enrolled at Lund University in 1683 and subsequently postmaster and deputy customs chief inspector of Uddevalla, Bohuslän, assumed the family name in accordance with that of his residence. Among his issue were Protestant reformer Peter Spaak (1696–1769), and Magnus Spaak (1699–1768), who emigrated to Brussels, Belgium. Among Magnus Spaak's issue was Jacques Joseph Spaak (1742–1825), painter.

== Members in selection ==
=== Sweden ===
- Peter Spaak (1696–1769), Protestant Reformer
- George Spaak (1877–1966), engineer
- Ragnar Spaak (1907–1979), physician

=== Belgium/France ===
- Jacques Joseph Spaak (1742–1825), Belgian painter
- Louis Spaak (1804–1893), Belgian architect
- Bob Spaak (1917–2011), Belgian sports journalist
- Paul Spaak (1871–1936), Belgian lawyer and playwright
- Marie Spaak (born Janson, 1873–1960), Belgian politician
  - Paul-Henri Spaak (1899–1972), Belgian politician, statesman, and one of the founding fathers of the European Union
    - Fernand Spaak (1923–1981), Belgian lawyer and diplomat
      - Isabelle Spaak (born 1960), Belgian writer
    - Antoinette Spaak (1928-2020), Belgian politician
  - Charles Spaak (1903–1975), Belgian screenwriter
    - Agnès Spaak (born 1944), actress and photographer
    - Catherine Spaak (1945–2022), French-Italian actress and singer
  - Suzanne Spaak (1905–1944), World War II French resistance operative

== See also ==
- Spaak government
- Paul-Henri Spaak Foundation
- Paul-Henri-Spaak-Straße in Munich, Germany
- Haute École Paul-Henri Spaak
- Paul-Henri Spaak building
- Spaak method
