= List of political families in Belgium =

During its history, Belgium has seen many families who have repeatedly produced notable politicians, and consequently such families have had a significant impact on politics in the Low Countries.

== Anciaux ==
- Vic Anciaux (1931–2023) VU (Brussels State Secretary)
  - Jan Anciaux (1958–) N-VA (Schepen in Vilvoorde)
  - Bert Anciaux (1959–) sp.a (Flemish Minister, Senator)
  - Koen Anciaux (1961–) Open Vld (Schepen in Mechelen)
  - Roel Anciaux (1971–) sp.a (member of Flemish Brabant Provincial Council)

== Coens ==
- Daniël Coens (1938–1992) CVP (Flemish Minister)
  - Joachim Coens (1966–) CD&V (Leader of CD&V)

== de Brouckère ==
- Henri de Brouckère (1801–91) Lib. (Prime Minister of Belgium)
- Charles de Brouckère (1796–1860) Lib. (Minister of Finance, Interior and War)

== De Croo ==
- Herman De Croo (1937–) VLD (Speaker of the Chamber, Minister of State)
  - Alexander De Croo (1975–) Open Vld (Prime Minister of Belgium)

== De Gucht ==
- Karel De Gucht (1954–) Open Vld (Minister of Foreign Affairs, European Commissioner)
  - Frédéric De Gucht (1981–) Anders (Leader of Anders)
  - Jean-Jacques De Gucht (1983–) Open Vld (Senator)

== Dehousse ==
- Fernand Dehousse (1906–76) PS (Minister of Education)
  - Jean-Maurice Dehousse (1936–2023) PS (Minister-President of Wallonia)

== Eyskens ==
- Gaston Eyskens (1905–88) CVP (Prime Minister of Belgium)
  - Mark Eyskens (1933–) CD&V (Prime Minister of Belgium)

== Janson ==
Paul Janson (1840–1913) Lib. (Senator)

- Paul-Emile Janson (1872–1944) Lib. (Prime Minister of Belgium)
- Marie Janson (1873–1960) PSB (Senator)

== Spaak ==
- Paul-Henri Spaak (1899–1972) PSB (Prime Minister of Belgium, Secretary General of NATO)
  - Antoinette Spaak (1928–2020) FDF (Member of the European Parliament)

== Simonet ==
- Henri Simonet (1931–96) PS (Minister of Economy and Foreign Affairs)
  - Jacques Simonet (1963–2007) MR (Minister-President of the Brussels-Capital Region)
    - Eléonore Simonet (1997–) MR (Minister of the Middle class, Self-Employed and SMEs)

== Vanderpoorten ==
- Arthur Vanderpoorten (1884–1945) Lib. (Minister of Interior)
  - Herman Vanderpoorten (1922–84) PVV (Minister of Interior and Justice)
    - Marleen Vanderpoorten (1954–;) Open Vld (Minister of Education, Speaker of the Flemish Parliament)

== Van Rompuy ==
- Herman Van Rompuy (1947–;) CD&V (President of the Chamber of Representatives, Prime Minister, President of the European Council)
  - Peter Van Rompuy (1980–;) CD&V (Senator)
- Eric Van Rompuy (1949–;) CD&V (Minister of Agriculture and Economy)
