= Peter Spaak =

Swedish protestant reformer

Peter Spaak (6 June 1696 – 2 December 1769) was a Swedish Protestant Reformer.

Challenging the Lutheran orthodoxy as an early proponent of freedom of religion in Sweden, he founded the society of Pietists based in the Diocese of Gothenburg, a society part of which was later integrated into the Church of Sweden.

== Biography ==
Peter Spaak was born 1696 in Uddevalla, Bohuslän, Sweden. His father Elias Jonæ Spaak served as the local Postmaster and Deputy Customs Chief Inspector, and his maternal grandfather was the Chief Judge Johan Larsson Crantzberg. Peter Spaak's brother Magnus Spaak (1699–1768) emigrated to Brussels, Belgium, becoming the primogenitor of the family cadet branch there, including his nephew fr:Jacques Joseph Spaak (1742-1825).

Peter Spaak was married twice. The first time was to Clara Charlotta Esberg, daughter of Zacharias Esberg the older, bishop electus of the Diocese of Växjö and sister of Zacharias Esberg the Younger, vicar of Uddevalla. His second marriage was to Ingrid Maria Bagge, daughter of Eva Christina Radhe Palmencrona, and great granddaughter of Nils Fredriksson Bagge, Mayor of Marstrand.

Professionally, Spaak served as Chief Inspector of the Customs service, and Postmaster in Uddevalla.

Influenced by the pietism of the German theologian Johann Konrad Dippel, along with Thomas Leopold and Johan Stendahl, Peter Spaak became one of the most prominent early proponents of the movement in Sweden. Originally, the new ideas were met with much opposition, culminating in the Conventicle Act in 1726. Like Leopold and Stendahl, at one time Spaak was threatened with prison sentence for heresy. However, contrary to the fate of the former two he was eventually relieved of the allegations, attributed to his contacts with the authorities, including notably family connections to clerics such as Zacharias Esberg the older and Zacharias Esberg the Younger, as well as Jacob Benzelius and Erik Benzelius the younger, the latter both subsequent archbishops of Uppsala.

The movement gained significant influence throughout the Diocese of Gothenburg. Spaak established a society based in Uddevalla.

For a period from 1734 onwards, Spaak resided in Stockholm, where he came in contact with the Skevikare radicals on Värmdö. Around this time, Riksdag meetings evaluated the influences of Pietism in the realm, having gained supporters also among mainline Protestant clergy, with Spaak, Sven Rosén, and others making early appeals to freedom of religion in opposition to the staunch Lutheran orthodoxy.

Peter Spaak died 1769 in Gothenburg.

Soon after, the initial criticism by the state authorities against the perceived cultural radicalism of the dissident Petists was relaxed, and the movement gained more popularity, right up to the Royal court. King Gustav III visited the Skevikare incognito in 1779. King Gustav IV Adolf made an official visit in 1797 with "tokens of appreciation". With time, Pietism was eventually reevaluated as a legitimate expression of Lutheranism.

By consequence, following the increased acceptance by the mainstream Protestant society, in the mid-19th century, a part of the Pietist movement was fully integrated into the official Evangelical-Lutheran Church of Sweden, although another part would persist in Radical Pietist deference into a Uddevalla local predecessor of the Protestant Uniting Church in Sweden, independent of the state church.

Subsequent to the great fire of Uddevalla in 1806, a stone house was erected for the Pietist adherents which gave the street block its name, Herrnhut. The building, later purchased by the municipality, remained until another fire in the 1980s.

== See also ==
- Spaak
- sv:Evangeliska Brödraförsamlingen i Norden
- Mission Covenant Church of Sweden
