= Catherine Spaak =

French-Italian actress, singer, and media personality (1945–2022)

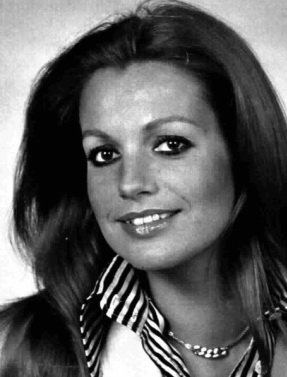
- Spaak in Radiocorriere magazine (1975)
- Born: 3 April 1945; Boulogne-Billancourt, France
- Died: 17 April 2022 (aged 77); Rome, Italy
- Citizenship: France; Italy
- Occupations: Actress, singer, model
- Years active: 1959–2020
- Spouses: Fabrizio Capucci (m. 1963; div. 1971); Johnny Dorelli (m. 1972; div. 1979); Daniel Rey (m. 1993; div. 2010); Vladimiro Tuselli (m. 2013; div. 2019)
- Children: 2
- Father: Charles Spaak
- Relatives: Agnès Spaak (sister); Paul-Henri Spaak (uncle); Marie Janson (grandmother); Antoinette Spaak (cousin); Fernand Spaak (cousin)
- Family: Spaak

Catherine Spaak (3 April 1945 – 17 April 2022) was a French-Italian actress, singer, model, and media personality. A member of the Spaak family, she was known as an iconic "It girl" in Italy during the 1960s, becoming a star of commedia all'italiana films, before later becoming prominent as a talk show host and media personality.

== Family ==
A member of the prominent Spaak family, Catherine was the daughter of Belgian screenwriter Charles Spaak and French actress Claudie Clèves (née Alice Perrier). Her older sister was actress Agnès Spaak. Her uncle, politician Paul-Henri Spaak, was the Prime Minister of Belgium from 1947 to 1949 and one of the founding fathers of the European Union. Her paternal grandmother was Marie Janson Spaak, Belgium's first female member of Parliament.

== Early life ==
Spaak was born on 3 April 1945 just outside of Paris in Boulogne-Billancourt, Hauts-de-Seine. Initially she wanted to be a ballerina and studied ballet in her youth, until she gave it up after being told she was too tall.

Spaak was inspired to be an actress when in the summer of 1955, she accompanied her father to a film set, where she saw Gina Lollobrigida. In response to her parents announcing that they were divorcing and eager to leave the boarding school, Spaak left home at the age of 15 and moved to Italy, where she settled and eventually became a naturalized citizen.

== Career ==
=== Actress ===
Spaak's first role was in the French 13-minute short L'hiver (1959), directed by Jacques Gautier, which was followed by a brief uncredited role in the French prison break film Le Trou (1960), which was directed by Jacques Becker. Spaak's brief appearance in Le Trou caught the eye of a Paris television reporter, and his subsequent interview with her was seen by Sophia Loren who thought that Spaak would be suitable for a major role in Sweet Deceptions, a film that her producer husband Carlo Ponti was intending to make in Rome. Released in 1960, Spaak's role as a 17-year-old student who has an affair with a middle-aged man brought her to attention of the wider public.

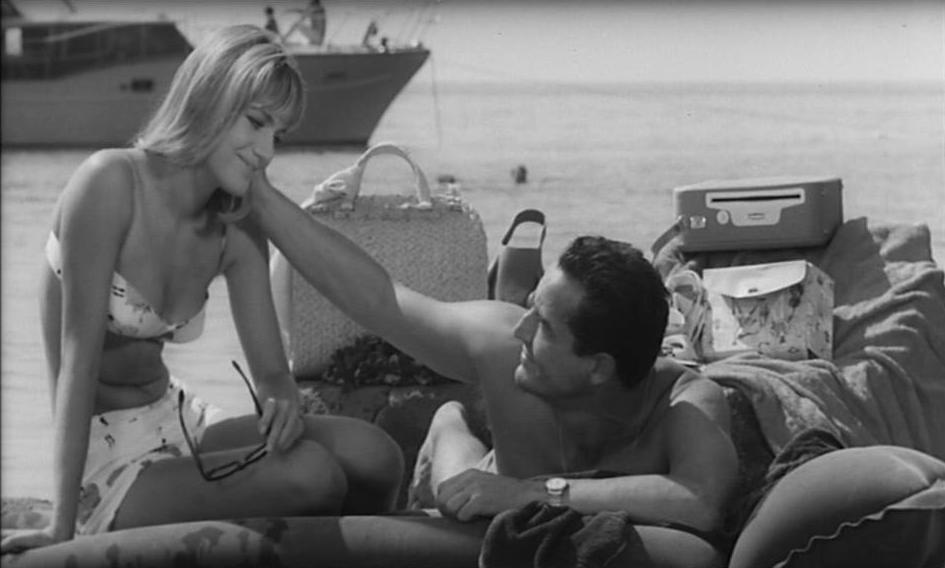
Spaak and Vittorio Gassman in Il Sorpasso (1962)

Spaak soon became a teenage star and It girl, and between the ages 15 to 18, she was the lead actress in at least 12 movies. In her initial roles, her dialogues were dubbed until she had learned Italian. Media coverage at the time dubbed her a "new woman of the '60s", and her hairstyle and fashion sense became oft-imitated by teenage girls throughout Italy.

As an adult, Spaak appeared in many comedies and a few dramas from the mid-1960s through the early 1980s. Among her most notable titles are Circle of Love (1964, directed by Roger Vadim), The Man, the Woman and the Money (1965, starring Marcello Mastroianni), For Love and Gold (1966, written by Age & Scarpelli), Adultery Italian Style (1966). Her first film role in an American production was as the mistress of an investor who wants to buy a landmark New Orleans hotel in the 1967 release Hotel.

Spaak's next significant role was as a young widow opposite Jean-Louis Trintignant in the 1968 sex comedy The Libertine. This was followed by Diary of a Telephone Operator (1969, with Claudia Cardinale), the giallo film The Cat o' Nine Tails (1971, written and directed by Dario Argento), the nunsploitation film Story of a Cloistered Nun (1973), the controversial comedy My Darling Slave (1973), the Spaghetti Western Take a Hard Ride (1975) opposite Jim Brown and Lee Van Cleef, Sunday Lovers (1980), Honey (1981) and Alice (2010, written and directed by Oreste Crisostomi).

She originated the role of Rossana in the Riccardo Pazzaglia-Domenico Modugno musical Cyrano (unrelated to the Anthony Burgess-Michael J. Lewis production of the same name) in 1979.

=== Singer ===
In the 1960s and 70s, Spaak also developed a parallel singing career, recording a number of albums. As a singer, she was regarded by some as the Italian equivalent of French chanteuse Françoise Hardy. Spaak recorded some of Hardy's songs in 1963 for the DET label under the direction of Ezio Leoni, who had previously worked with Hardy.

=== Talk show host ===
As her film career began to decline in the 1980s, Spaak transitioned to journalism and television. She was a co-host of the Canale 5-Rete 4 program Forum, one of the longest-running continuous shows in Italian history, from 1985 to 1988. She then hosted a popular talk show called Harem that ran for 16 years, from 1988 to 2002. She then hosted a short-lived talk show, Il sogno dell'angelo, on La7 from 2002 to 2003.

In 2007, she participated as a contestant on the Italian edition of Dancing with the Stars, but was eliminated in the third round. In 2015, she appeared on the 10th season of the reality show L'isola dei famosi.

== Personal life ==
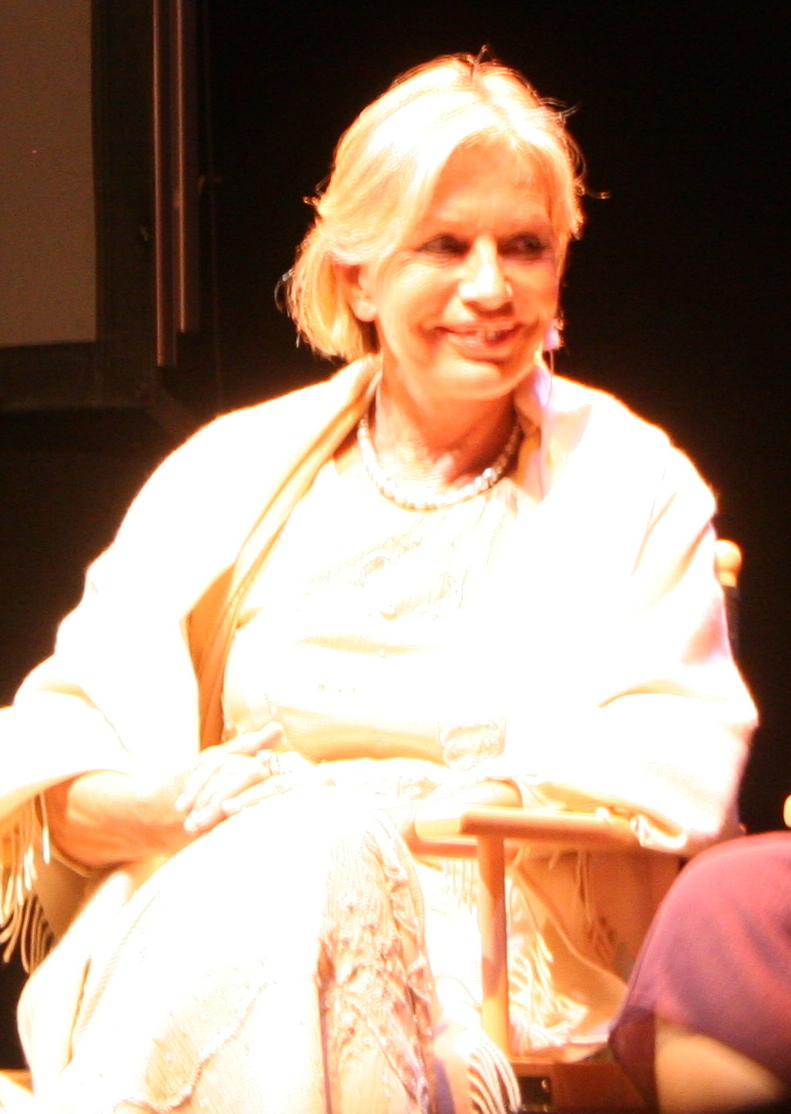
Spaak in 2011

Spaak was married four times. Her first marriage was on 30 January 1963 at the age of 18 to actor Fabrizio Capucci, whom she had met on the set of the film La voglia matta (1962) and with whom she had a daughter, Sabrina.

Following her divorce from Capucci in 1971, Spaak was married from August 1972 to 1979 to Italian entertainer Johnny Dorelli with whom she had a son, Gabriele Guidi.

From 1993 to 2010, she was married to architect Daniel Rey, and from July 2013 to June 2020 to Vladimiro Tuselli.

Spaak was a convert to Buddhism. She was also vegetarian and an animal rights activist.

=== Death ===
Spaak died in Rome on 17 April 2022 at the age of 77, a year after suffering a brain hemorrhage.

== Partial filmography ==
- L'hiver (1959)
- The Hole (1960)
- Sweet Deceptions (1960)
- Il carro armato dell'8 settembre (1960)
- Crazy Desire (1961)
- Three Faces of Sin (1961)
- Il Sorpasso (1962)
- Of Wayward Love (1962)
- Eighteen in the Sun (1962)
- The Girl from Parma (1963)
- The Empty Canvas (1963)
- The Warm Life (1963)
- Three Nights of Love (1964)
- Weekend at Dunkirk (1964)
- Circle of Love (1964)
- Made in Italy (1965)
- The Man, the Woman and the Money (1965)
- For Love and Gold (1965)
- Break Up (1965)
- Madamigella di Maupin (1966)
- Adultery Italian Style (1966)
- Hotel (1967)
- A Complicated Girl (1968)
- The Libertine (1968)
- If It's Tuesday, This Must Be Belgium (1969)
- Diary of a Telephone Operator (1969)
- The Cat o' Nine Tails (1971)
- Ripped Off (1972)
- Cause of Divorce (1972)
- Story of a Cloistered Nun (1973)
- Dear Parents (1973)
- My Darling Slave (1973)
- La via dei babbuini (1974)
- Take a Hard Ride (1975)
- Febbre da cavallo (1976)
- Per vivere meglio, divertitevi con noi (1978)
- Catherine and I (1980)
- Sunday Lovers (1980)
- The Precarious Bank Teller (1980)
- Honey (1981)
- Claretta (1984)
- Secret Scandal (1989)
- Une famille formidable (TV, 1993)
- I Can See It in Your Eyes (2004)
- Alice (2010)
- Zen (TV, 2011)
- La vacanza (2019, final film role)
