= Paul Spaak =

Belgian lawyer and playwright (1871– 1936)

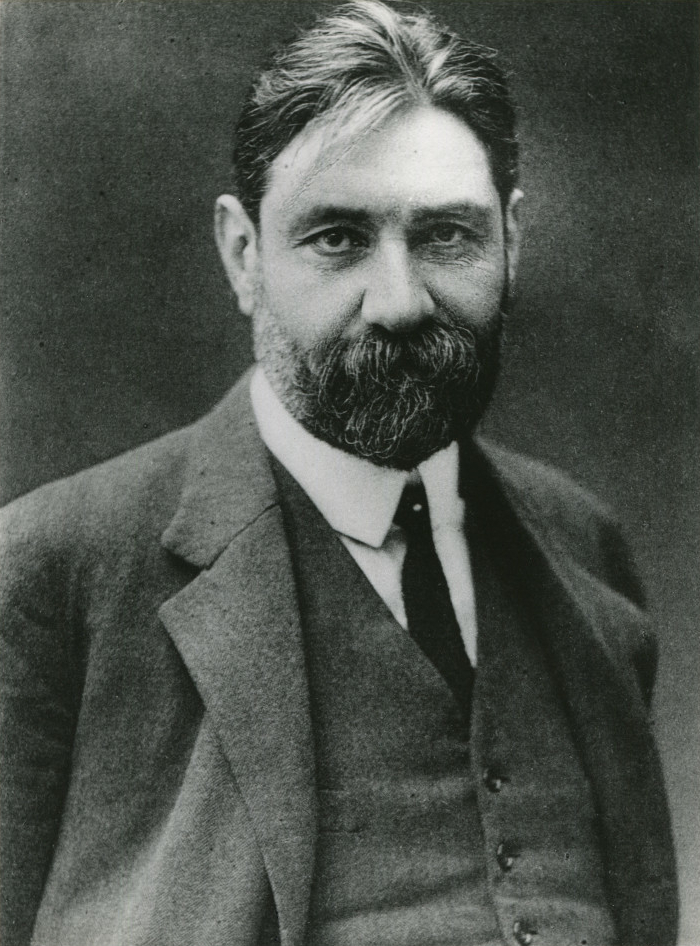
- Spaak in 1912.
- Born: 5 July 1871; Ixelles, Belgium
- Died: 8 May 1936 (aged 64); Ixelles, Belgium

Paul Louis François Spaak (5 July 1871 – 8 May 1936) was a Belgian lawyer, poet, literary historian, and playwright.

Born in Ixelles, Spaak graduated in law at the Université libre de Bruxelles in 1894. On 22 July 1894, he married Marie Janson, daughter of Paul Janson. The couple had four children, of whom Paul-Henri Spaak, later Belgian Prime Minister like his uncle Paul-Emile Janson, was the most famous. Paul Spaak was a member of Royal Academy of Belgium from 19 August 1920 until 8 May 1936.

From 1920 until his death, Paul Spaak was co-director of the Royal Theatre of La Monnaie. He shared this position with Maurice Corneil de Thoran and Jean Van Glabbeke.

== Selection of works ==
- L'hérédité dans la littérature française antérieure au XIX^{e} siècle, in: Revue Universitaire, 1893
- Les Voyages vers mon pays, 1907 (collection of poems)
- Kaatje, 1908 (theatre play, premiered at the Royal Park Theatre, Brussels)
- La Madone, 1908 (theatre play, premiered at the Théâtre de l'Œuvre, Paris)
- La Dixième Journée, 1908 (theatre play, premiered at the Théâtre de l'Œuvre, Paris)
- Le Louez-Dieu, 1908 (theatre play, premiered at the Théâtre Royal du Parc, Brussels)
- A Damme en Flandre, 1912 (theatre play)
- Camille, 1913, (comedy)
- Malgré ceux qui tombent, 1919, (drama)
- Un songe d'une nuit d'été, 1919 (comedy)
- Diadesté, 1921 (comedy)
- Jean Lemaire de Belges, 1926 (article)
- Poèmes 1898–1921, 1937 (published after his death, poetry)

== Sources ==
- Paul Spaak (French)
- André ROUSSEAU, Paul Spaak, in Biographie Nationale, part 38, col. 735–744, Brussels, 1974.
- José MIRVAL, Le littérateur belge Paul Spaak, Brussels, 1938.
- Gustave VANZYPE, Notice sur Paul Spaak, in: Annuaire de l'Académie royale de langue et de littérature françaises de Belgique 1938, p. 37–64, Brussels, 1938.
