= List of speakers of the Parliament of the French Community of Belgium =

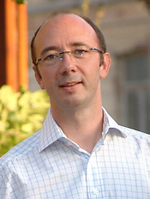
Incumbent speaker Rudy Demotte

This article contains a list of speakers of the Parliament of the French Community of Belgium.

Name	Entered office	Left office
Georges Dejardin	December 7, 1971	October 15, 1973
Emile-Edgar Jeunehomme	October 16, 1973	October 20, 1975
Lucien Outers	October 21, 1975	October 18, 1976
Emile-Edgar Jeunehomme	October 19, 1976	June 13, 1977
Paul de Stexhe	June 14, 1977	April 9, 1979
Léon Hurez	April 10, 1979	November 3, 1980
Irèné Pétry	November 4, 1980	October 18, 1982
Michel Toussaint	October 19, 1982	October 15, 1984
Charles Poswick	October 16, 1984	December 2, 1985
Jean-Pierre Grafé	December 3, 1985	February 1, 1988
Antoinette Spaak	February 2, 1988	January 6, 1992
Anne-Marie Corbisier Hagon	January 7, 1992	July 5, 1999
Willy Taminaux	July 13, 1999	April 3, 2000
Richard Miller	April 4, 2000	October 16, 2000
Jean-Marie Severin	October 17, 2000	October 16, 2001
Françoise Schepmans	October 16, 2001	July 5, 2004
Freddy Deghilage	July 6, 2004	July 18, 2004
Isabelle Simonis	July 19, 2004	October 27, 2004
Jean-François Istasse	October 28, 2004	30 June 2009
Jean-Charles Luperto	16 July 2009	November 18, 2014
Philippe Courard	November 19, 2014	September 17, 2019
Rudy Demotte	September 17, 2019	Incumbent

== Sources ==
- Official website of the Parliament of the French Community Retrieved on 2009-05-02
