= Charles Poswick =

Belgian politician

President of the Parliament of the French Community
- In office 16 October 1984 – 2 December 1985
- Preceded by: Michel Toussaint
- Succeeded by: Jean-Pierre Grafé

Personal details
- Born: 6 October 1924 Limbourg, Belgium
- Died: 28 July 1994 (aged 69) Zolder, Belgium
- Party: Reformist Movement
- Education: Catholic University of Leuven

Charles Marie Jean Joseph Elvire Ghislain baron Poswick (6 October 1924 – 28 July 1994) was a Belgian politician for the PLP. Poswick was doctor in Law and licentiate in commercial and financial sciences.

He became para-commando and broker. Poswick was a member of parliament (1965–1991) for the PLP for the district Namur and President of the French community Council (1984–1985) and of the Walloon district Council (1985–1988). He was minister of defence from 1966 up to 1968 and in 1980.

== Sources ==
- Charles Poswick (In French)
- Charles Poswick (Liberal Archive, in Dutch)
- Van Molle, P., Het Belgisch parlement 1894–1969, Gent, Erasmus, 1969, p. 276.
- Kamer van Volksvertegenwoordigers. Officieel Handboek, 1988, p. 161.

Political offices
Preceded by Michel Toussaint	President of the Parliament of the French Community; 1984–1985	Succeeded by Jean-Pierre Grafé
