= Paul-Henri Spaak =

Belgian politician (1899–1972)

His Excellency Paul-Henri Spaak
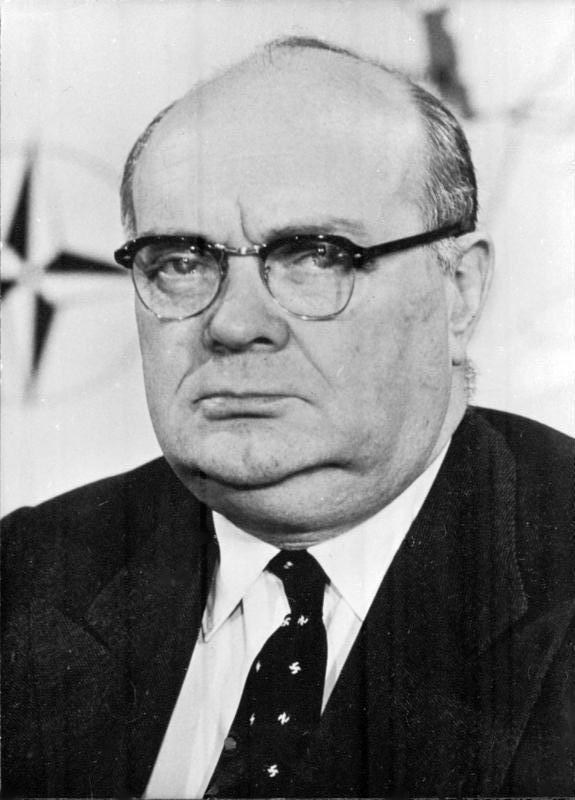
- Spaak in 1957

Prime Minister of Belgium
- In office 20 March 1947 – 11 August 1949
- Monarch: Leopold III
- Regent: Prince Charles
- Preceded by: Camille Huysmans
- Succeeded by: Gaston Eyskens
- In office 13 March 1946 – 31 March 1946
- Monarch: Leopold III
- Regent: Prince Charles
- Preceded by: Achille Van Acker
- Succeeded by: Achille Van Acker
- In office 15 May 1938 – 22 February 1939
- Monarch: Leopold III
- Preceded by: Paul-Emile Janson
- Succeeded by: Hubert Pierlot
Other positions
2nd Secretary General of NATO
In office 16 May 1957 – 21 April 1961
Preceded by	Hastings Ismay
Succeeded by	Dirk Stikker
President of the Common Assembly (European Coal and Steel Community)
In office 11 September 1952 – 11 May 1954
Preceded by	Office established
Succeeded by	Alcide De Gasperi
President of the United Nations General Assembly
In office 31 March 1946 – 20 March 1947
Preceded by	Office established
Succeeded by	Oswaldo Aranha

Personal details
- Born: Paul-Henri Charles Spaak; 25 January 1899 Schaerbeek, Belgium
- Died: 31 July 1972 (aged 73) Braine-l'Alleud, Belgium
- Party: Belgian Workers' Party; Belgian Socialist Party
- Spouse(s): Marguerite Malevez (m. 1921; died 1964) Simonne Dear (m. 1965)
- Relations: Spaak family
- Children: 3, including Antoinette and Fernand
- Parents: Paul Spaak (father); Marie Janson (mother)
- Education: Free University of Brussels

Paul-Henri Charles Spaak (French: [pɔl ɑ̃ʁi ʃaʁl spak]; 25 January 1899 – 31 July 1972) was an influential Belgian Socialist politician, diplomat, and statesman who thrice served as the prime minister of Belgium and later as the second secretary general of NATO. Nicknamed "Mr. Europe", he was a leader in the formation of the institutions that evolved into the current European Union, along with Robert Schuman, Alcide De Gasperi and Konrad Adenauer.

A member of the influential Spaak family, he served briefly in World War I before he was captured, and rose to prominence after the war as a tennis player and lawyer, becoming famous for his high-profile defence of an Italian student accused of attempting to assassinate Italy's crown prince in 1929. A convinced socialist, Spaak entered politics in 1932 for the Belgian Workers' Party (later the Belgian Socialist Party) and gained his first ministerial portfolio in the government of Paul Van Zeeland in 1935.

He became the prime minister in 1938 and held the position until 1939. During World War II, he served as foreign minister in the London-based Belgian government in exile under Hubert Pierlot, where he negotiated the foundation of the Benelux Customs Union with the governments of the Netherlands and Luxembourg. After the war, he twice regained the premiership, first for under a month in March 1946 and again between 1947 and 1949. He held various further Belgian ministerial portfolios until 1966. He was Belgium's foreign minister for 18 years between 1939 and 1966.

Spaak, a convinced supporter of multilateralism, became internationally famous for his support of international cooperation, in which he hoped to include geopolitical enemies of Belgium and NATO such as the Soviet Union and its satellite states. In 1945, he was chosen to chair the first session of the General Assembly of the new United Nations. A long-running supporter of European integration, Spaak had been an early advocate of customs union and had negotiated the Benelux agreement in 1944.

He served as the first President of the Consultative Assembly of the Council of Europe between 1949 and 1950 and became the first President of the Common Assembly of the European Coal and Steel Community (ECSC) — which would later become the European Parliament — between 1952 and 1954. In 1955, he was appointed to the so-called Spaak Committee studying the possibility of a common market within Europe and played an influential role in preparing the 1957 Treaty of Rome which established the European Economic Community (EEC). He received the Charlemagne Prize the same year. Between 1957 and 1961, he served as the second secretary general of NATO, becoming the only secretary general to have previously served as prime minister until Anders Fogh Rasmussen in 2009.

Retiring from Belgian politics in 1966, Spaak died in 1972. He remains an influential figure in European politics and his name is carried, among other things, by a charitable foundation, roads and structures, including one of the buildings of the European Parliament, and a method of negotiation.

== Personal background and life ==
Paul-Henri Spaak was born on 25 January 1899 in Schaerbeek, Belgium into the prominent Spaak-Janson family. His maternal grandfather, Paul Janson, was an important member of the Liberal Party. His mother, Marie Janson, was a socialist, and the first woman to enter the Belgian Senate, and his father, Paul Spaak, was a poet and playwright. Other noted members of his family included his uncle, Paul-Émile Janson, who served as Prime Minister of Belgium from 1937 to 1938, and his niece, Catherine Spaak, a movie star, singer and television presenter.

Paul-Henri Spaak and his wife Marguerite Malevez were married in 1921 and had three children: diplomat Fernand Spaak (1923–1981), Marie Marguerite Spaak (1926–2000, later married British diplomat Michael Palliser), and Antoinette Spaak (1928–2020), the first Belgian woman to lead a political party, the Democratic Front of Francophones. In 1943 Malevez was arrested by the Gestapo as a member of a resistance movement and imprisoned for a few weeks in Saint-Gilles Prison in Brussels. After his wife's death on 14 August 1964, he married 56-year-old Antwerp-born divorcee and longtime friend Simonne Rikkers Hottlet Dear (1908–1975) on 23 April 1965. His brother was the screenwriter Charles Spaak. One of his granddaughters is the journalist and novelist Isabelle Spaak, and one of his grandsons is the artist Anthony Palliser.

During the 1940s, during his time in New York with the United Nations, he also had an affair with the American fashion designer Pauline Fairfax Potter (1908–1976).

His son Fernand served in 1981 as chief of staff for Gaston Thorn, president of the European Commission, until he became the victim of his wife's murder–suicide on 18 July 1981.

== Early life and education ==
During the German invasion of Belgium in 1914, Spaak attempted to join the Belgian Army but was captured and spent the next two years as a prisoner of war in Germany. At the end of the war, Spaak was released from captivity and entered the Free University of Brussels, where he studied law. During the same period, Spaak was also a tennis star, and played for the Belgian team in the 1922 Davis Cup.

After receiving his law degree, Spaak practised as a lawyer in Brussels, where he "excelled in defending Communists charged with conspiring against the security of the realm", and others including Fernando de Rosa, an anarchist Italian student who attempted to kill Crown Prince Umberto of Italy during a state visit by the prince to Brussels.

== Post-World War I Belgian politics ==
He became a member of the Socialist Belgian Labour Party in 1920. He was elected deputy in 1932. In 1935, he entered the cabinet of Paul Van Zeeland as Minister of Transport. In February 1936 he became Minister of Foreign Affairs, serving first under Van Zeeland and then under his uncle, Paul-Émile Janson. From May 1938 to February 1939 he was Prime Minister for the first time. In 1938, he allowed Herman Van Breda to smuggle the legacy of Edmund Husserl out of Nazi Germany to Belgium through the Belgian Embassy in Berlin.

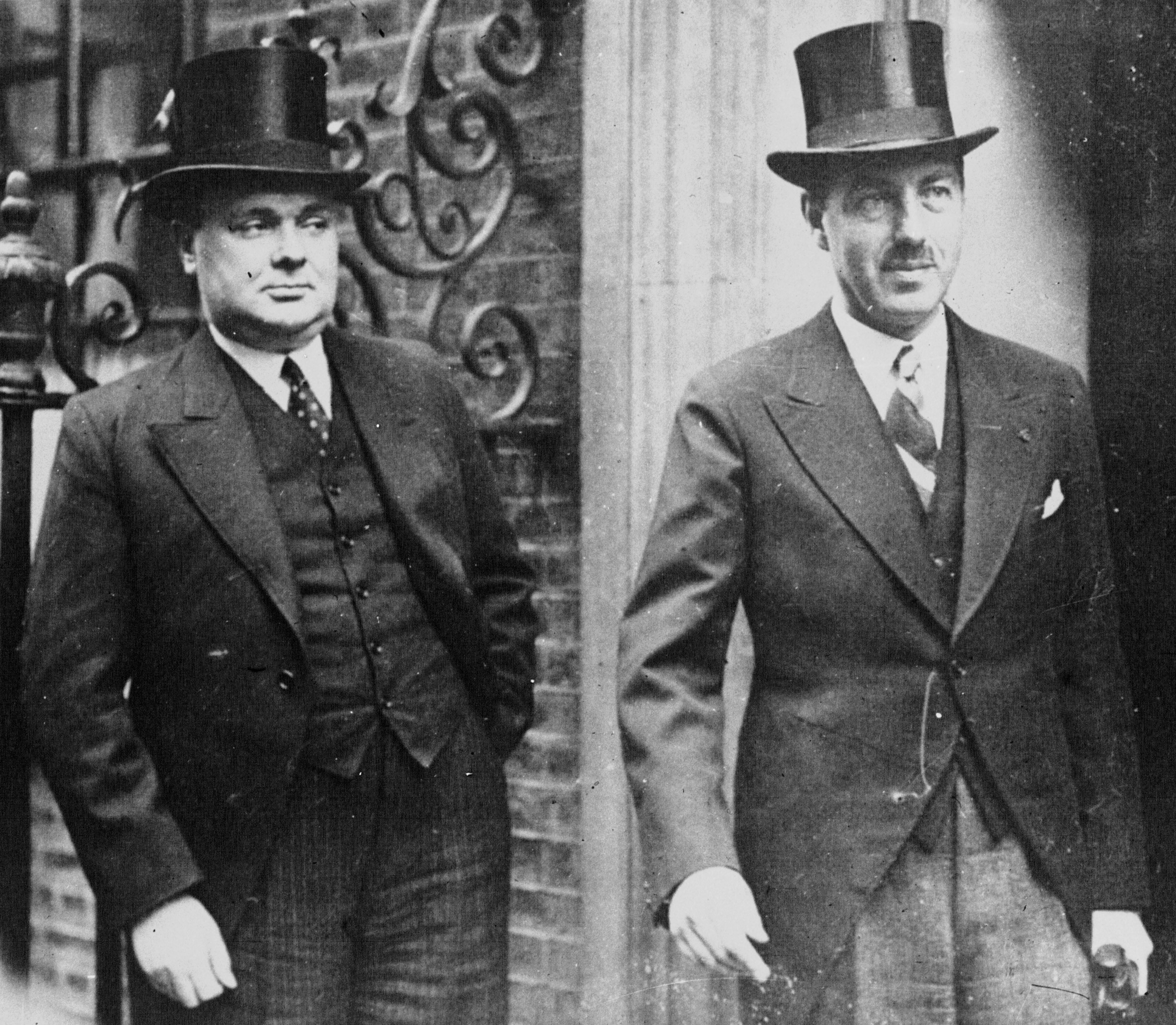
Spaak (left) with Paul Van Zeeland in 1937

In social policy, a number of progressive reforms were realised during Spaak's first premiership. An Act of June 1938 "increased the functions of the National Society for Cheap Houses and Dwellings and empowered it, under State guarantee, to contract a loan of 350 million francs," while a Royal Decree of July 1938 laid down the rules for applying the provisions of a Holidays with Pay Act passed in 1936 to agricultural, horticultural and forestry undertakings. An Act of 20 August 1938 amended and supplemented the 1936 Holidays with Pay Act by extending its coverage to all undertakings, whatever their number of wage earners, as well as to home workers. The Act also removed a previous requirement in which a wage earner had to work for at least a year with the same employer in order to earn an annual holiday. The old-age, invalidity, and survivors' insurance program for miners was modified by an act passed on 8 July 1938, which increased the benefits available to invalids, the elderly, and widows who already received pensions while also significantly expanding the requirements for the granting of invalidity pensions.

An Order of 25 August 1938 prohibited the use of so-called motor spirit "for greasing, cleaning (hands) etc.," while a Royal Order of 27 August 1938 fixed normal weekly hours of actual work in the ship-repairing industry in Antwerp at 42 hours "distributed over the seven days of the week."

A Royal Order of 27 December 1938 extended the scope of an eight-hour Act passed in June 1921 to cover technical staff employed in cinemas, and a Royal Order of 22 December 1938 amended the entries in the second column of the schedule (list of occupations) which was now brought into conformity with Convention No. 42, and added "in the case of pneumoconiosis, sand-blasting processes in iron and steel foundries.

When he was Minister of Foreign Affairs from 1936 to 1940, Spaak adhered to the political independence of Belgium and carried on the long-standing Belgian policy of neutrality, with no formal military cooperation with France or the United Kingdom and no open hostility to the Germans. On 10 May 1940, Germany invaded Belgium, Luxembourg, the Netherlands and France. In disarray and with almost all of the country occupied, the Belgian Army — by the command of King Leopold III — surrendered on May 18, leading to a constitutional conflict with part of the government (including Spaak), which wanted to continue military operations together with France. The rump of the Belgian government regrouped in Limoges and Bordeaux and stayed close to the French, who surrendered on 22 June.

Again conflict arose in the Belgian government between those who wanted to stay in France (and maybe return to Belgium) — among these Spaak and Belgian Prime Minister Hubert Pierlot — and others who wanted to leave for London and to continue the war effort further. Minister Marcel-Henri Jaspar — done with the quarrelling — left on June 24 for London and tried to form a new government and obtain recognition from the British. For this, he was thrown out of the government at once by Pierlot and Spaak.

After the repeal of diplomatic status by the French, Spaak finally went to Britain. Travelling in difficult circumstances with Pierlot through Spain and Portugal, partially even in the false bottom of a truck, they arrived in London in October 1940.

== Post-World War II domestic policies ==
After the war, he was Minister of Foreign Affairs under the subsequent ministers Achille Van Acker and Camille Huysmans. He was twice appointed Prime Minister as well, first from 13 to 31 March 1946, the shortest government in Belgian history, and again from March 1947 to August 1949. During his last government, two important pieces of housing legislation were enacted. The De Taeye Act of 1948 organised fiscal rebates, credit facilities, and premiums for social dwellings built either on private or public initiative, while the Brunfaut Act of 1949 established a central budgeting organisation for governmental social housing policy, shifted the financial burden of infrastructural works to the state, and organised the financing of the two National Housing Societies. Under a law of 16 June 1947 holiday duration was tripled for under 18 year olds, and doubled for those between the ages of 18 and 21. Holiday pay was also doubled for the first week by the law of August the 10th 1947.

A bill on war damage, agreed upon in October 1947, stipulated that owners of homes damaged by the war and took the initiative to restore them were entitled to compensation. In 1948, voting rights for women were introduced. An Act providing for the establishment of works councils was promulgated in September 1948, while a school building fund was set up that same year "to supply the material needs of secondary education." Also in 1948, the multilateral school was introduced.

Various measures were also introduced to improve working conditions in mines. From June 1947 onward, all young workers under the age of 18 became entitled to three weeks' annual paid leave, while workers between the ages of 18 and 21 became entitled to at least a fortnight. A decree of September 1947 introduced the compulsory establishment of mine safety services and safety and health committees in all mines, while another Decree issued that same month revised and expanded the provisions related to hygiene installations, medical examination, rescue, and first aid. An Order of the regent regulating the use of explosives in undertakings other than mines and underground quarries dated 31 March 1949 "deals with the loading, priming, tamping, firing and signalling of shots and policing of the area; certain special types of shotfiring such as firing in a confined space or underwater; incomplete explosions and misfires; liquid air or liquid oxygen explosives and the use of detonating fuses; supervision of the use of explosives; the reporting of accidents and incidents."

Automatic indexation of 95% of wages was provided from 1948 onwards, while women were provided with access to the magistracy from 1948 onwards. In December 1948, an Act was passed that replaced the National Society for War Orphans with the National Society for Orphans, Widows and Ascendants of War Victims. In June 1948, legislation was introduced that doubled holiday remuneration for workers, and in August 1948 a law was passed that introduced nonconfessional moral instruction in secondary education. Company and sector-based joint committees were alsoestablished by a social law, with work councils in big companies needing to be consulted whenever economic issues with a social impact were tackled.

== Foreign policies ==
He was again foreign minister from April 1954 to June 1958 in the cabinet of Achille Van Acker and from April 1961 to March 1966 in the cabinets of Théo Lefèvre and Pierre Harmel. Although his political base was in the Socialist Party, he disagreed with its policies on several critical points, including Atlanticism, recognition of Franco's Spain, and the language issue inside Belgium. During Spaak's final term as Belgium's Foreign Minister, he presided over Belgium granting independence to Burundi following the assassination of Prince Louis Rwagasore, the country's first elected prime minister. Despite allegations of Belgian involvement in Rwagasore's murder, Spaak appealed to Belgian King Baudouin not to grant Rwagasore's convicted murderer a pardon.

=== UN ===
Spaak gained international prominence in 1945 when he was elected chairman of the first session of the General Assembly of the United Nations. During the third session of the UN General Assembly in 1948 in Paris, Spaak apostrophized the delegation of the Soviet Union with the famous words: "peur de vous" (fear of you).

=== Europe ===
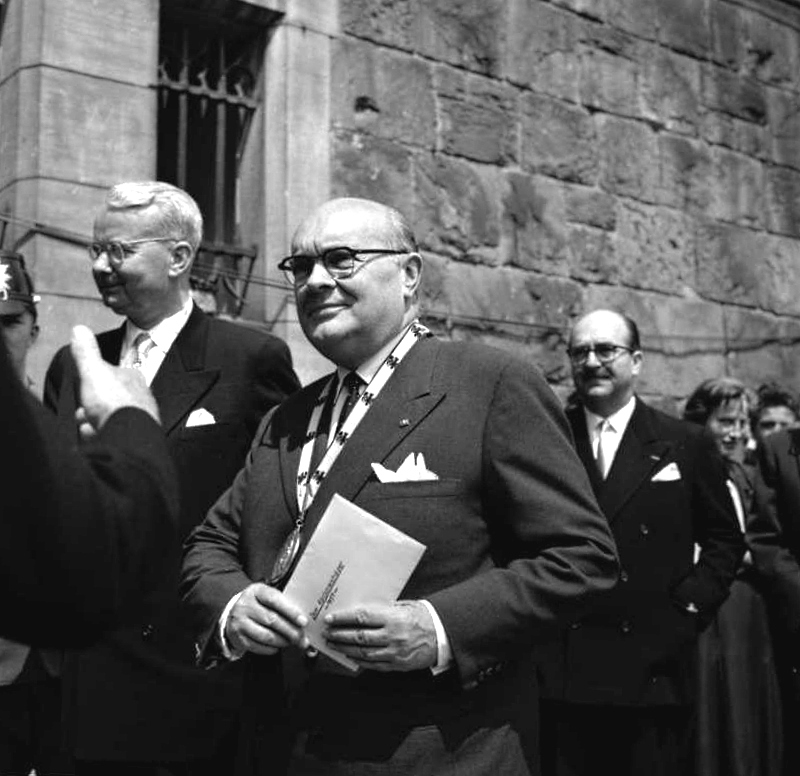
Spaak photographed receiving the Charlemagne Prize in 1957

Spaak became a staunch supporter of regional cooperation and collective security after 1944. While still in exile in London, he promoted the creation of a customs union uniting Belgium, the Netherlands and Luxembourg (see Benelux). In 1948 he helped organize a Congress that met in The Hague and pressed hard for the creation of the Council of Europe. In August 1949, at its first session, he was elected President of the Council of Europe's Consultative Assembly, where he helped develop a network of intergovernmental contacts in many fields, and did his best to encourage further steps towards a political body to unite Europe. However, after three years of patient cajoling at the Council of Europe, Spaak came to understand that the organization was not ready to move towards the united Europe that he dreamed of, and in December 1951 - after the Assembly rejected a proposal to set up a European "political authority" - he resigned, declaring his great regret at this missed opportunity. But he continued to press for European integration as head of the European Movement, and it was not long before he returned to the fray, in a new and more promising forum: from 1952 to 1953, he presided over the Common Assembly of the European Coal and Steel Community, the body which was eventually to grow into the European Union.

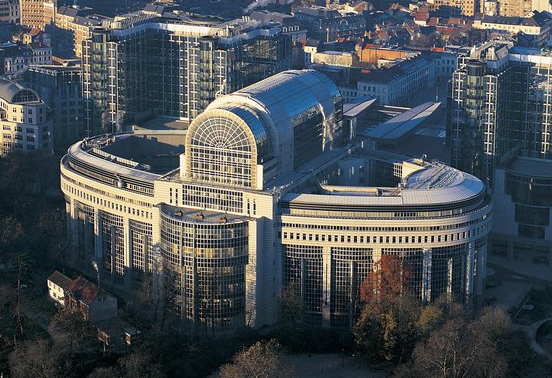
The Paul-Henri Spaak building in Brussels, part of the European Parliament complex.

But, as Spaak had shrewdly foreseen, tying the coal and steel industries of France and Germany together - at that time the two industries necessary to make war - was just the first step. His next goal was to expand the concept far beyond these two industries into a much wider economic body, which could in turn form the embryo of a political union. In 1955, the Messina Conference of European leaders appointed him as chairman of a preparatory committee (Spaak Committee) charged with the preparation of a report on the creation of a common European market. The so-called "Spaak Report " formed the cornerstone of the Intergovernmental Conference on the Common Market and Euratom at Val Duchesse in 1956 and led to the signature, on 25 March 1957, of the Treaties of Rome establishing a European Economic Community and the European Atomic Energy Community (Euratom). Paul-Henri Spaak signed the treaty for Belgium, together with Jean Charles Snoy et d'Oppuers. It was a crowning achievement of decades of patient work, and his role in the creation of the EEC earned Spaak a place among the founding fathers of the European Union.

=== NATO ===
In 1956, he was chosen by the Council of NATO to succeed Lord Ismay as secretary general. He held this office from 1957 until 1961, when he was succeeded by Dirk Stikker. He feuded constantly with French president Charles de Gaulle. He publicly attacked de Gaulle, blaming him for unjustly and unwisely blocking NATO's progress and stalling efforts toward European and Atlantic integration. De Gaulle was uncompromising on issues related to national sovereignty, mistrusted the United States and considered Britain to be an American puppet; he insisted on developing French nuclear capabilities. Although Spaak used every diplomatic method at his disposal, his opinion mattered little to the main players in NATO. When, in 1962, France, under de Gaulle, attempted to block both British entry to the European Communities and undermine their supranational foundation with the Fouchet Plan, Spaak working with Joseph Luns of the Netherlands rebuffed the idea. He was a staunch defender of the independence of the European Commission. "Europe of tomorrow must be a supranational Europe," he declared. In honour of his work for Europe, the first building of the European Parliament in Brussels was named after him. When France withdrew from an active role in NATO in 1966, he was instrumental in the selection of Brussels as the new headquarters.

On 21 February 1961, Spaak was presented with the Medal of Freedom by US President John F. Kennedy.

== Retirement and death ==
Paul-Henri Spaak retired from politics in 1966. He was member of the Royal Belgian Academy of French Language and Literature. In 1969, he published his memoirs in two volumes titled Combats inachevés ("The Continuing Battle", literally, "unfinished fights").

Spaak died aged 73, of kidney failure on 31 July 1972, in his home in Braine-l'Alleud near Brussels, and was buried in Braine-l'Alleud.

== Legacy ==
Paul-Henri Spaak, nicknamed "Mr. Europe", was the main motive for one of the most recent and famous gold commemorative coins: the Belgian 3 pioneers of the European unification commemorative coin, minted in 2002. The obverse side shows a portrait with the names Robert Schuman, Paul-Henri Spaak and Konrad Adenauer, the three unifiers of Europe.

In the election for De Grootste Belg (The Greatest Belgian) Spaak ended on the 40th place in the Flemish version and on the 11th place in the Walloon version.

Numerous streets, avenues, and institutional buildings are named in honor of Paul-Henri Spaak across the Benelux region and internationally:

=== Belgium ===
- Brussels:
  - The Rue Paul Spaak (Paul Spaakstraat) is a street that forms the border between Ixelles and the City of Brussels municipality.
  - The Avenue Paul-Henri Spaak (Paul-Henri Spaaklaan) is an avenue located in the Saint-Gilles municipality.
  - The Paul-Henri Spaak building is the primary building of the Espace Léopold complex in the Leopold Quarter, housing the European Parliament's main debating chamber and the president's offices.

=== France ===
- Vert-Saint-Denis: The Rue Paul-Henri Spaak is a commercial avenue situated in a business park named after fellow European Union founding father Jean Monnet.

=== Germany ===
- Munich: The Paul-Henri-Spaak-Straße is a local access street running next to the Munich Trade Fair in the Messestadt Riem district.

=== Netherlands ===
- Almere: The Spaakstraat is a street in the Staatsliedenwijk neighborhood.
- Goes: The Spaakstraat is a street in the Goes-Noordwest district.
- Maastricht: The Paul-Henri Spaaklaan is a street in the Randwyck neighborhood. The street lends its name to Maastricht University's Paul-Henri Spaaklaan 1 building (PHS1), which houses the university's Faculty of Science and Engineering, the Maastricht Science Programme, and student learning spaces.
- Zevenaar: The Spaakstraat is a street in the Methen neighborhood.

== Distinctions ==
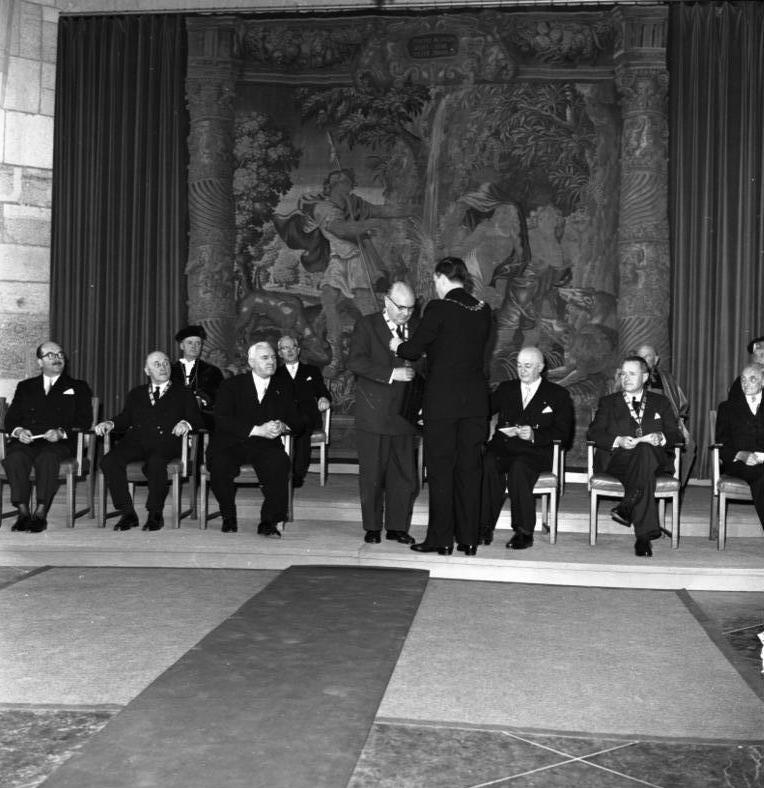
Paul-Henri Spaak conferred the Charlemagne Prize in 1957.

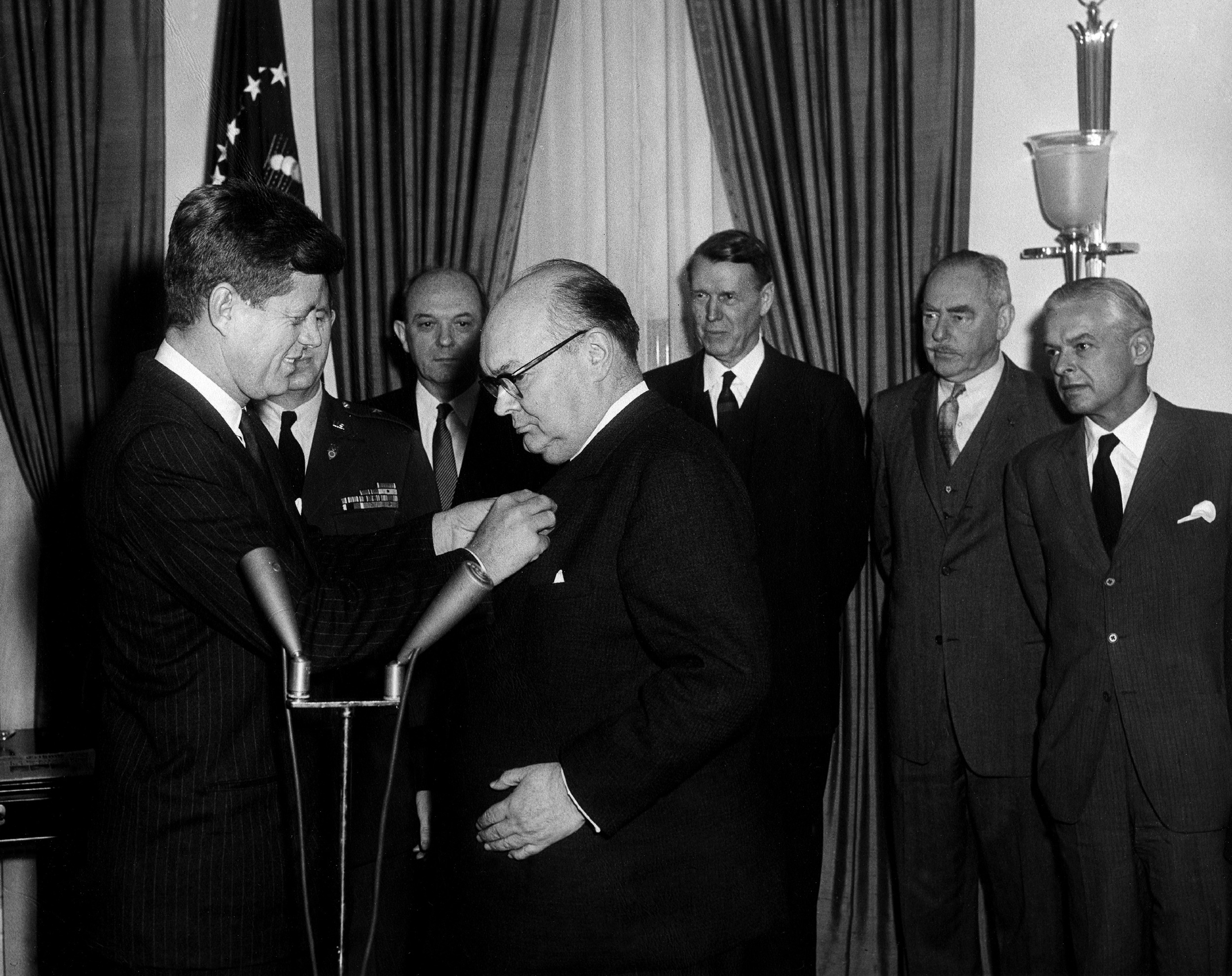
Spaak receives the Medal of Freedom (1945) from President John F. Kennedy in 1961

=== National honours ===
- Belgium: Minister of state, by Royal Decree
- Belgium: Member of the Royal Academy
- Belgium: Grand Cordon in the Order of Leopold
- Belgium: Knight Grand Cross in the Order of the Crown

=== Foreign orders ===
- Holy See: Order of Pope Pius IX
- France: Legion of Honour
- Germany: Order of Merit of the Federal Republic of Germany (1956)
- Italy: Grand Cross of the Order of Merit of the Italian Republic (5 May 1956)
- United Kingdom: Honorary Member of the Order of the Companions of Honour (14 May 1963)
- United Kingdom: Honorary Knight Grand Cross of the Order of St Michael and St George (1937)
- Netherlands: Order of the Netherlands Lion
- Portugal: Grand Cross of the Order of Christ (10 August 1955)
- Czechoslovakia: Grand Cross of the Order of the White Lion (1947)
- Sweden: Order of Vasa
- Denmark: Order of the Dannebrog
- Norway: Order of St. Olav
- Iceland: Grand Cross of the Order of the Falcon (21 August 1963)
- Luxembourg: Order of the Oak Crown
- Greece: Order of George I
- Kingdom of Yugoslavia: Order of the Yugoslav Crown
- Lebanon: National Order of the Cedar
- Venezuela: Order of the Liberator
- Iran: Order of the Crown
- Japan: Order of the Rising Sun
- Thailand: Order of the White Elephant
- Central African Republic: Grand Officer of the Order of Merit
- Zaire: National Order of the Leopard
- Lithuania: Order of Vytautas the Great
- Tunisia: Order of the Republic
- Brazil: Grand Cross of the Order of the Southern Cross
- Finland: Order of the White Rose of Finland
- Colombia: Order of San Carlos
- Cuba:Order of Carlos Manuel de Céspedes
- Ivory Coast: National Order of the Ivory Coast

=== Academic ===
- Fellow of the American Academy of Arts and Sciences (1950)

=== Other ===
- Charlemagne Prize (1957) by the city of Aachen for his merit in the union and security of Europe
- Medal of Freedom in silver with palm by U.S. President John F. Kennedy
- Euro gold and silver commemorative coins (2002)

== See also ==
- Spaak method of negotiating
- Paul-Henri Spaak building
- Paul-Henri Spaak Foundation
- Robert Rothschild, diplomat, chef de cabinet

Political offices
Preceded by Paul-Emile Janson	Prime Minister of Belgium; 1938–1939	Succeeded by Hubert Pierlot
Preceded by Achille Van Acker	Prime Minister of Belgium; 1946	Succeeded by Achille Van Acker
Preceded by Camille Huysmans	Prime Minister of Belgium; 1947–1949	Succeeded by Gaston Eyskens
Positions in intergovernmental organisations
New office	President of the Common Assembly of the European Coal and Steel Community; 1952–1954	Succeeded by Alcide De Gasperi
New office	President of the United Nations General Assembly; 1946–1947	Succeeded by Oswaldo Aranha
Preceded by Édouard Herriot; Acting	President of the Parliamentary Assembly of the Council of Europe; 1949–1951	Succeeded by François de Menthon
Preceded by Hastings Ismay	Secretary General of the North Atlantic Treaty Organization; 1957–1961	Succeeded by Dirk Stikker
