= Fernando de Rosa =

Italian student who tried to kill Umberto, Prince of Piedmont

Fernando De Rosa
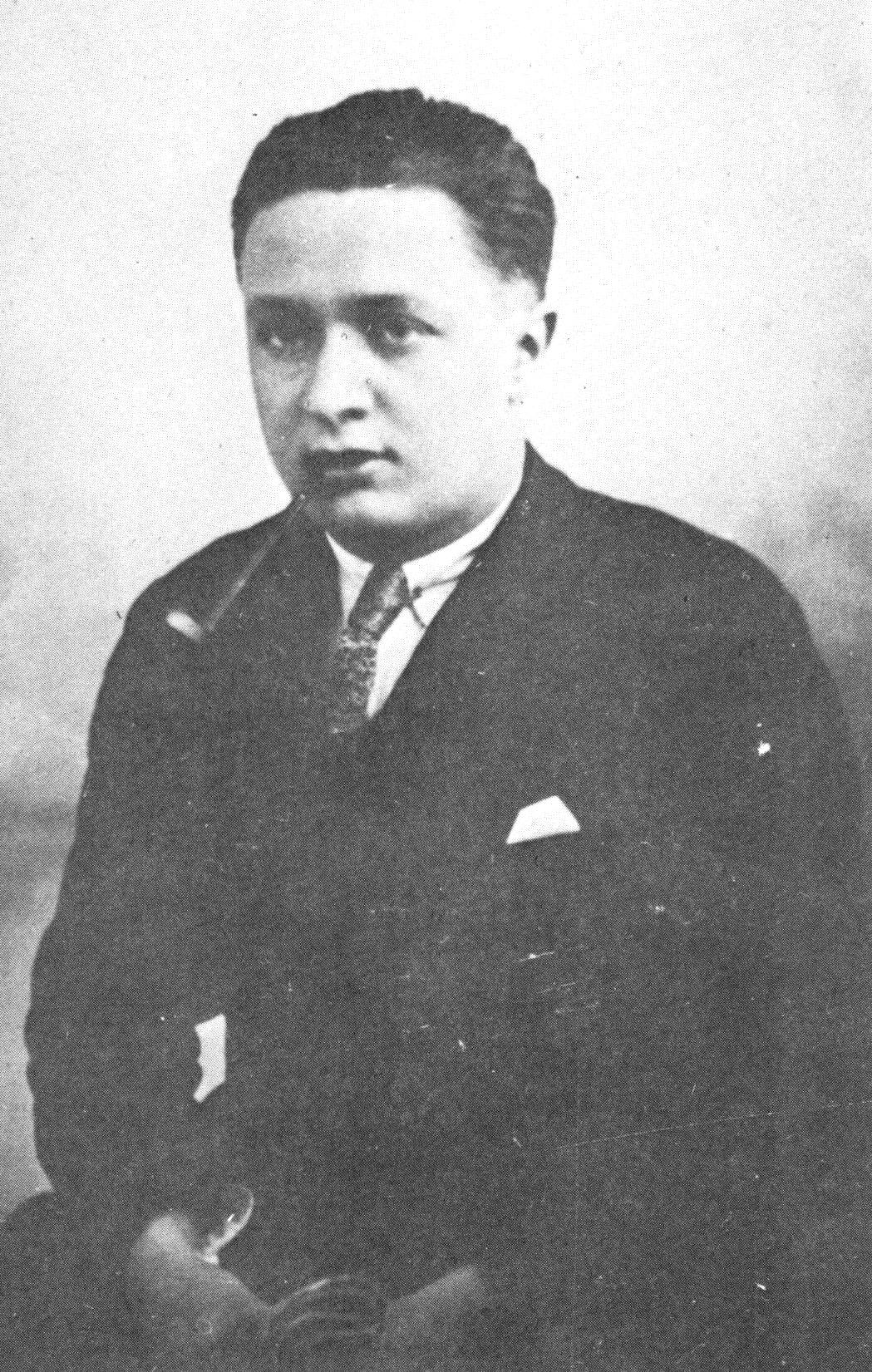
- Fernando De Rosa in 1935
- Born: Fernando Lencioni; 7 October 1908; Milan
- Died: October 1936 (aged 27–28); Madrid
- Known for: Attempted assassination of Umberto II

Fernando De Rosa (7 October 1908 – October 1936) was an Italian student who attempted to assassinate Umberto, Prince of Piedmont, later Umberto II of Italy in Brussels on 24 October 1929. De Rosa was born in Milan and studied law in Turin before fleeing Italy for France in order to avoid imprisonment for his political views. He remained in Paris for about a year, studying law at the University of Paris and writing for an anti-fascist journal.

In October 1929, De Rosa travelled to Brussels and fired a shot at Italian Crown Prince Umberto II in an attempted assassination. The shot missed and De Rosa was promptly arrested. His trial became a major political event, and though he was found guilty of attempted murder, he was given a light sentence of five years in prison. This sentence caused a political uproar in Italy and a brief rift in Belgian-Italian relations. In March 1932, De Rosa was pardoned at the request of Prince Umberto and released, having served slightly less than half of his sentence. He announced an intention to return to Paris and continue his legal studies, but ended up in Spain, where he was arrested for taking part in a socialist uprising in 1934. He died in October 1936 while fighting in the Spanish Civil War.

== Early life ==
De Rosa was born on 7 October 1908 in Milan as Fernando Lencioni, and was left at the hospital there by a midwife. He was adopted by a local family and brought up as their own child, changing his name to De Rosa in 1918. He lived in Milan until 1922 or 1923, when he left to study in Turin, eventually enrolling in a law program there. In 1928, fearing that he would be imprisoned by Mussolini's regime for his political views, he crossed the Alps on skis into France. Upon his arrival in France, he was arrested by the French police, but after explaining his circumstances, he was given a French identity card and allowed to remain in the country. He then moved to Paris where he wrote for an anti-fascist journal and studied law at the University of Paris. While he was in Paris, De Rosa's political views also radicalized. He became a committed socialist and declared himself a member of the Second International.

== Assassination attempt ==
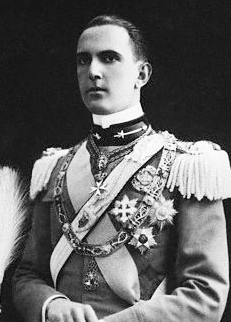
Crown Prince Umberto

In October 1929, De Rosa travelled from Paris to Brussels (he later gave contradictory statements about the precise date to the police) armed with a revolver, and planning to shoot Umberto II, then Crown Prince of Italy. De Rosa got within twelve feet of Prince Umberto, who was visiting Belgium's Tomb of the Unknown Soldier, then fired one shot from his revolver; however, he slipped just as he was firing the shot, which missed. After firing the shot, De Rosa's revolver jammed, preventing him from firing another, and he was quickly subdued by a Belgian policeman. De Rosa told the police that before firing, he shouted "Long Live Matteotti!" in reference to Giacomo Matteotti, an Italian socialist killed by the fascist party, but other witnesses stated that he yelled "Down with Mussolini!"

After the assassination attempt, the crowd grew angry, yelling "Death to the assassin", and a lynch mob formed with the goal of killing De Rosa. The police, however, took De Rosa away after a struggle with the crowd. The struggle left De Rosa "so bruised ... as to be all but unconscious", but he reached the police station without suffering permanent injuries. According to media accounts, Prince Umberto heard the shots, "but scarcely turned his head," continuing the planned program at the tomb, then reviewing the Belgian honour guard, and carrying on with his day. The Belgian people were thoroughly outraged by the event, and King Albert immediately visited Prince Umberto at the Italian Embassy, where he was staying, to offer his apologies and congratulate the prince on his good fortune in escaping the attempt.

== Investigation and trial ==
After his arrest, De Rosa was quickly questioned by the police about his actions. He testified that he had acted alone and had been planning to kill either Mussolini or a member of the Italian royal family for some time. His desire to kill one of them was motivated by his strong anti-fascist beliefs. He told the investigating magistrate quite unapologetically: "I regret having missed him. I was unable to fire again because my pistol jammed." Although the police believed that De Rosa had acted alone, they found the charred remains of a letter in the room where he had been staying, leading to speculation that he had been put up to the attempt by some other group, and arrested another Italian student who had been at the Tomb of the Unknown Soldier at the time of the attempt.

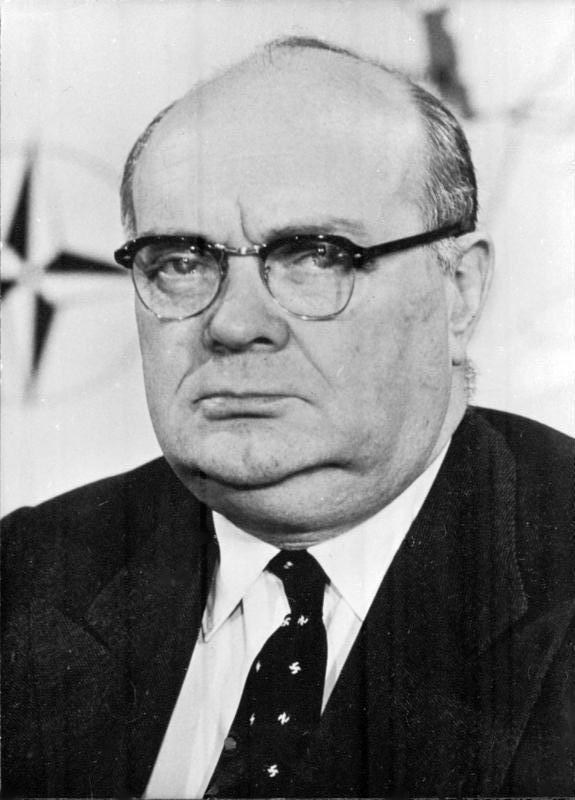
Paul-Henri Spaak, one of De Rosa's lawyers

On 25 September 1930, De Rosa's trial began in Brussels. In the trial, he was represented by Paul-Henri Spaak, later the Prime Minister of Belgium and a specialist in defending political radicals, and Paul De Bock, a noted Belgian writer and lawyer. The trial began with a statement from De Rosa, which "sounded mostly like a sermon against fascism," setting a political tone that would continue throughout the proceedings.

By way of a defence, De Rosa claimed that "he had intentionally fired into the air" rather than at Prince Umberto, and that his shot was intended to clear the crowd before a second shot which would have killed the prince. He stated that after firing the first shot, "his hat blew off and he felt suddenly ridiculous", so he laid down the pistol instead of firing again. De Rosa reiterated that he had acted alone, and that none of the anti-Fascist groups to which he belonged had been involved in planning the attack.

The second day of De Rosa's trial was intensely political. Francesco Nitti, former Prime Minister of Italy and a strong anti-fascist, testified on behalf of De Rosa, calling him "an honest, moderate, loyal, and well-educated young man" and defending De Rosa's actions through a sharp attack on fascism. His testimony was not nearly as sensational as that of Louis de Brouckere, a Belgian Senator, who testified that the Italian government was "preparing for war on both sides of the Albanian border as well as along the Alps". Other major Belgian and Italian figures testified as well, as part of a strategy "to show that the Fascist era had crushed out liberty in Italy and that an action such as de Rosa's was explainable by the effect such repression might have." In their closing statement, De Rosa's lawyers even went so far as to say: "It is the fascist rule that is being tried."

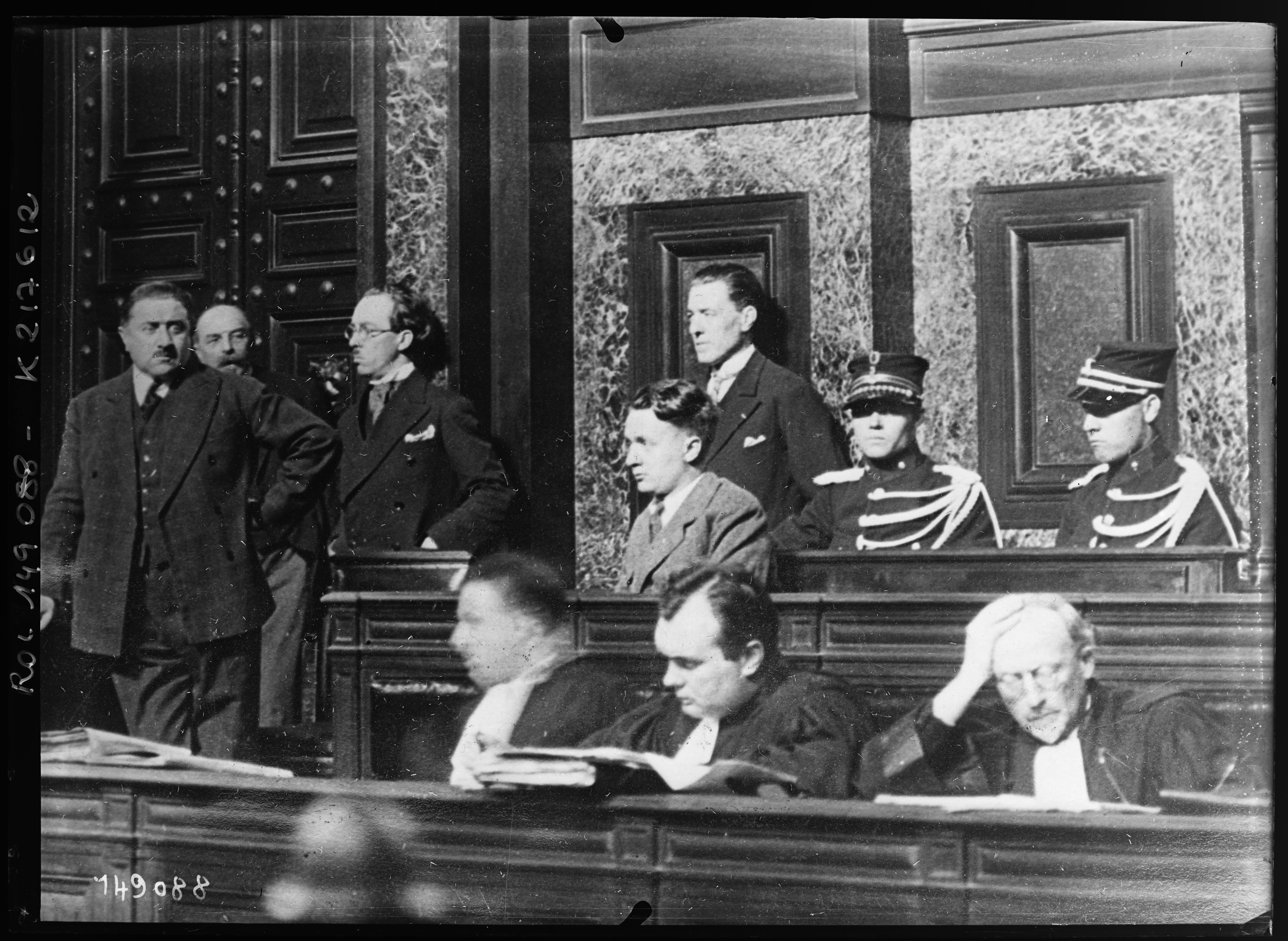
De Rosa at trial

In reaction to the intense politicization of the case, the prosecutor urged the jury to only consider the matter of whether de Rosa had attempted to kill Umberto (staying out of the political matters), and demanded "severe punishment". After only half an hour of deliberation, the jury returned a guilty verdict, but sentenced De Rosa to only five years in prison. The news was greeted by immediate "disappointment" in Italy, where the public and government had hoped for a much longer sentence. Upon learning of the light sentence and the considerable anti-fascist content of the trial, Benito Mussolini was "so dissatisfied ... that he suggested the recall of the Italian ambassador from Brussels."

== Pardon and later life ==
On 16 March 1932, after De Rosa had served about half of his five-year sentence, he was pardoned by King Albert at the request of Prince Umberto. He was released the next day and announced that he would return to Paris in order to resume his legal studies. He soon, however, entered Spain where he was arrested in October 1934, for participation in a Socialist uprising in Madrid. After his release, he joined socialist forces in the Spanish Civil War. He died in October 1936 in fighting near Madrid.
