= Anthony Palliser =

British painter (born 1949)

Anthony Palliser (born 1949) is a British painter.

== Biography ==
Anthony Palliser was born in 1949. He is the grandson of Belgian Prime Minister Paul-Henri Spaak and the son of British diplomat Michael Palliser. Palliser has lived in Paris since 1970. He studied in England at Downside School and graduated from New College, Oxford. In 1967 he attended the Academy of Fine Arts in Rome.

He taught at the New York School of Visual Arts in Savannah, Georgia, US, from 1995 to 1997.

Palliser has had many solo and group exhibitions across Europe and in the United States. His portrait of Graham Greene hangs in the National Portrait Gallery (London) and that of Paddy Ashdown in the House of Commons of the United Kingdom. A portrait of the historian Sir Michael Howard was commissioned for the Michael Howard Reading Room at the Liddell Hart Centre for Military Archives in King's College London in 2002. Other portrait subjects include fashion designer Kenzo Takada, celebrated publicist Bobby Zarem, the poet Derek Mahon, director James Ivory and actresses Kristin Scott Thomas and Charlotte Rampling.

A book of Palliser's works was published in France in 2005, at the same time as an exhibition of "Large Heads" at the Ricard Foundation, Paris.

A retrospective exhibition was held in 2009 at the Telfair Museum of Art's Jepson Center for the Arts in Savannah, Georgia.

Palliser is married to Diane Lawyer.
