= Fred Chaffart =

Belgian businessman (1936-2010)

- Born: 1936; Deurne, Belgium
- Died: 22 February 2010 (aged 73–74); Brussels
- Education: master's degree in Economics
- Alma mater: Stanford University
- Occupation: Businessman

Ferdinand "Fred" Chaffart (1936 in Deurne, Belgium – 22 February 2010 in Brussels) was a Belgian businessman.

== Education ==
He obtained a master's degree in Economics and completed the Senior Executive Program at Stanford University (United States).

== Career ==
He started his career in the paint shop of his parents. In 1964 he started working at the marketing department of Procter & Gamble and subsequently worked for several marketing bureaus and the marketing department of IPPA Bank. In 1979 he started working for the Tiense Suiker (E: Sugar factory of Tienen), where he became CEO. In 1989, the company was sold to Südzucker. From 1990 until 1998 he worked for CBR Cement and the Generale Bank (Fortis), wherein both cases he became CEO. After the acquisition of Fortis by Suez in 1998, he left the company. He became president of the board of the Gevaert holding for a short while. In 1999 the Belgian government asked him to manage the dioxin crisis. In 2001 he became chairman of the board of directors of Sabena, but could not save the company from bankruptcy. From 2000 until 2005, he was president of the European League for Economic Cooperation.

Until his death in 2010 he was a director of Agfa-Gevaert, Icos Vision Systems, Spadel and VUM.

== Sources ==
- Fred chaffart & Sabena
- Fred chaffart & Icos Vision Systems
- De Morgen, 23 februari 2010: Biografie Fred Chaffart
