= Fredrik Bagge =

Swedish Lutheran priest

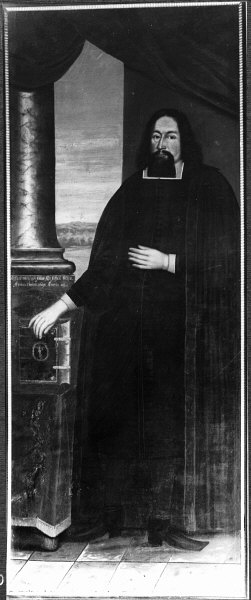
Solberga kyrka - KMB - 16000200008092

Fredrik Bagge (1646–1713) was a Swedish Lutheran vicar in the Church of Sweden in Marstrand, Bohuslän.

Fredrik Bagge was born in Marstrand 24 December 1646 to the Mayor Nils Bagge, and Malin Burgesdotter. After studies at the University of Copenhagen and the University of Uppsala, among other foreign universities, he was promoted to Doctor of Philosophy of the University of Wittenberg in 1667. Two years later he was appointed vicar in Marstrand.

Bagges was acknowledged not only as a learned man, but also for his unshakeable loyalty to his fatherland.

After the Danish-Norwegian victory against the Swedes in the Battle of Marstrand 1677, Fredrik Bagge was ordered to celebrate Te Deum and proclaim prayers to the King Christian V of Denmark and his armed forces. Instead, in the presence of the Danish Commander-in-chief and officers of the Danish invasion forces, he gave prayers to King Charles XI of Sweden and for his victory against Denmark–Norway. As a result, he was imprisoned in Carlsten by court-martial and sentenced to death. At the trial, he initiated a powerful speech in support of the Swedish crown, when a Danish officer ran up to him and put a hand on the vicar's mouth, insisting to General Ulrik Frederik Gyldenløve to "not let him speak, or else he will make ridicule of us all". He relocated to Fredriksten awaiting the outcome.

Yet, as a wealthy man, he avoided the death sentence only by paying three-double man prices.

Upon return of the Swedes to Marstrand, King Charles XI of Sweden bestowed him lavish praise, distinguishing him amonger things with the appointment to Rural Dean with annexes.

== Sources ==
- Bio website
- G. Walli: Fredrik Bagge in Svenskt biografiskt lexikon (1920)
