= Belgian general strike of 1936 =

General strike in Belgium

General strike
- 1936; Part of general strikes in Belgium
- Date: June-July
- Location: Belgium
- Methods: Wildcat strikes

Parties
Workers	Belgian government

Lead figures
	Paul van Zeeland

Casualties
- Results: Legal minimum wage; Six days' paid holidays; 40-hour week

In Belgium, a general strike took place in June and July 1936. It was the first wave of strikes since the 1932 general strike which had occurred during the Great Depression. It broke out as part of a wildcat strike among dockworkers in the Port of Antwerp on 2 June 1936 and quickly spread to other industrial regions without the endorsement of the country's major trades unions. It was characterised by the new tactic of workplace occupations and took place against the backdrop of the creation of France's Popular Front in May 1936 and the Matignon Agreements which had followed a general strike in France from May to June 1936. It also occurred against the backdrop of the Spanish Civil War which proved divisive in Belgium. Nonetheless, the Belgian strike was unusual in uniting socialist and Catholic trade union federations in support.

Paul Van Zeeland, the incumbent Catholic prime minister, agreed to convene a National Labour Conference (Conférence Nationale du Travail) on 17 June 1936 to bring together trade union and company representatives. It brokered a compromise agreement including the introduction of a legal minimum wage, six days' paid holidays, and a maximum 40-hour working week for workers in particular industrial occupations. It also including the right to form trades unions. The strike formally ended on 2 July 1936.
