= Sweet Deceptions =

- Directed by: Alberto Lattuada
- Starring: Catherine Spaak
- Cinematography: Gábor Pogány
- Edited by: Leo Catozzo
- Music by: Piero Piccioni
- Distributed by: Titanus
- Release date: 1960
- Language: Italian

I dolci inganni (internationally released as Sweet Deceptions) is a 1960 Italian drama film directed by Alberto Lattuada. The film tells one day in the life of a young adolescent girl who is discovering her sexuality.

== Plot ==
Francesca (Catherine Spaak) is a 17-year-old girl who has a vivid dream of having sex with Enrico (Christian Marquand), a 37-year-old divorced architect and family friend. She skips school to watch lovers as she contemplates whether she should act on her feelings.

== Cast ==
- Catherine Spaak as Francesca
- Christian Marquand as Enrico
- Jean Sorel as Renato
- Juanita Faust as Maria Grazia
- Milly as the Countess
- Marilù Tolo as Margherita
- Giacomo Furia as the salumiere
