= Isabelle Simonis =

Belgian politician

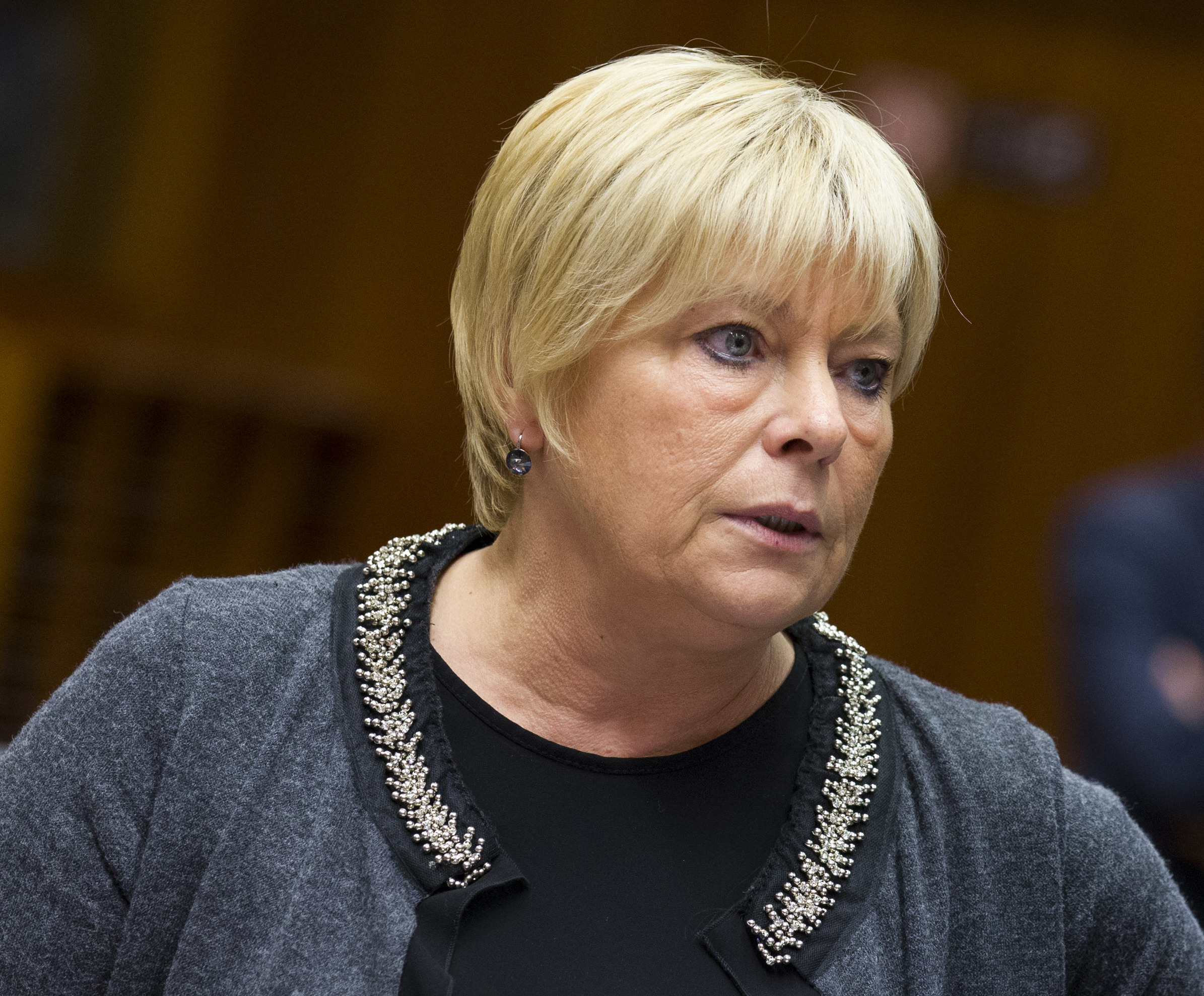

President of the Parliament of the French Community
- In office 19 July 2004 – 27 October 2004
- Preceded by: Freddy Deghilage
- Succeeded by: Jean-François Istasse

Personal details
- Born: 4 March 1967 (age 59) Ougrée, Belgium
- Party: Socialist Party

Isabelle Simonis (born 4 March 1967) is a Belgian politician from the Socialist Party.

Simonis studied communication, and she was active in the socialist women's rights movement.

== Political career ==
- 2003-2004: Secretary of state for family and persons with a handicap
- 2004: Chairperson of the Parliament of the French Community. She had to resign after a scandal about the use of public funds for projects with the objective to obtain the votes of migrants for her party
- 2004–present: Member of the Walloon Parliament and the Parliament of the French Community
- 2007–present: Mayor of Flémalle

Political offices
Preceded by Freddy Deghilage	President of the Parliament of the French Community; 2004	Succeeded by Jean-François Istasse
