= Michael Palliser =

British diplomat

Sir Arthur Michael Palliser GCMG, PC (9 April 1922 – 19 June 2012) was a senior British diplomat who served as the Permanent Under-Secretary of State for Foreign Affairs from 1975 to 1982.

== Life ==
Born in Reigate, Surrey, the son of Admiral Sir Arthur Palliser, he received his education at Wellington College and Merton College, Oxford. Appointed a Second Lieutenant 21 November 1942, he served in the Coldstream Guards during World War II. In 1947, he joined the British Diplomatic Service and held a number of appointments at home and abroad including Head of the Policy Planning Staff, Private Secretary to the prime minister, Minister at the British Embassy in Paris, Ambassador and Permanent Representative to the European Communities, and, from 1975 to 1982, Permanent Under-Secretary of State and Head of the Diplomatic Service. From April to July 1982, during the Falklands campaign, he served as Special Adviser to the Prime Minister in the Cabinet Office.

He was appointed a member of the Privy Council in 1983. That same year, he joined the board of the London investment bank Samuel Montagu & Co., a subsidiary of the Midland Bank, of which he became a deputy chairman. He was chairman of Samuel Montagu from 1984 to 1993, then vice chairman until his retirement in 1996.

From 1983 to 1992, he was non-executive director of several industrial companies. From 1986 to 1994, he was a member of the board of the Royal National Theatre. Sir Michael served on the faculty of many Salzburg Seminar Sessions.

=== Personal life ===
In 1948, Sir Michael married Marie Marguerite Spaak, daughter of Belgian statesman Paul-Henri Spaak. They had three sons: Anthony, a painter, Peter, a screenwriter, and Nicholas, a communication executive consultant.

== Honours ==
- Knight of the Order of Orange Nassau with Swords (1947)
- Companion of the Order of St. Michael and St. George (1966)
- Knight Commander of the Order of St. Michael and St. George (1973)
- Knight Grand Cross of the Order of St. Michael and St. George (1977)
- Her Majesty's Most Honourable Privy Council (1983)

Diplomatic posts
Preceded by Sir Oliver Wright	Private Secretary for Foreign Affairs to the Prime Minister; 1966–1969	Succeeded by Sir Edward Youde
Preceded by Newly created appointment	Permanent Representatives to the European Economic Community; 1973–1975	Succeeded by Donald Maitland
Preceded by Baron Brimelow	Permanent Secretary of the Foreign and Commonwealth Office; 1975–1982	Succeeded by Antony Acland
