= Diary of a Telephone Operator =

Certo certissimo... anzi probabile
- Directed by: Marcello Fondato
- Written by: Dacia Maraini
- Starring: Claudia Cardinale
- Cinematography: Alfio Contini
- Music by: Carlo Rustichelli
- Release date: 1969
- Running time: 120 minutes
- Country: Italy
- Language: Italian

Certo certissimo... anzi probabile (Certain, Very Certain, As a Matter of Fact... Probable; English title Diary of a Telephone Operator) is a 1969 Italian film based on the story of the same title by Dacia Maraini. It stars Claudia Cardinale and Catherine Spaak.

== Plot ==
Marta works as a telephone operator for a telephone company. She lives with her friend Nanda in Nanda's flat but Nanda's priority is above anything else to find a husband. When she feels she has found the right man she doesn't want Marta any longer in her flat. But while Nanda's relationship fails, Marta meets and marries a man named Piero. Only then it turns out her husband has an old friend. The man, a foreigner, moves in with the two of them. Marta tries to pair off the foreigner with her single friend Nanda. Both women think this might work out. But Piero's friend has bought a boat in order to sail around the world with Piero and when the friend announces to do this alone, Marta's husband has a breakdown. In the end Piero abandons Marta, explaining to her that he has no plans for a return from this journey with his friend.

== Cast ==
- Claudia Cardinale: Marta Chiaretti
- Catherine Spaak: Nanda
- Robert Hoffmann: Stefano
- Nino Castelnuovo: Piero
- John Phillip Law: Crispino
- Aldo Giuffrè: the widow
- Alberto Lionello: director of a telephone company
- Antonio Sabàto: Carmelo
- Dada Gallotti: Marta's boss
- Francesco Mulé: examiner
- Lino Banfi: photographer
