= Radhe family =

Swedish family

Radhe is a Swedish family.

An early primogenitor was Bryngel Radhe, burgher and restaurateur in Gothenburg (dead November 5, 1679). He was married January 17, 1656 in Gothenburg to Maria Hantons (dead June 11, 1680), daughter of presumably a Scottish immigrant. One branch was ennobled as Gripenstedt in 1717. Another branch was ennobled as Palmencrona in 1718.
