= My Darling Slave =

1973 film by Giorgio Capitani

- Film poster
- Directed by: Giorgio Capitani
- Written by: Sandro Continenza; Giulio Scarnicci; Raimondo Vianello
- Produced by: Renato Jaboni
- Starring: Lando Buzzanca
- Cinematography: Alessandro D'Eva
- Edited by: Carlo Marino; Mario Recupito
- Music by: Piero Umiliani
- Distributed by: Medusa Distribuzione
- Release date: 1973
- Running time: 96 minutes
- Country: Italy
- Language: Italian

My Darling Slave (Italian: La schiava io ce l'ho e tu no, "The [female] slave, I have her and you don't", also known as The Slave) is a 1973 Italian comedy film directed by Giorgio Capitani. It stars Lando Buzzanca, Catherine Spaak, and Adriana Asti.

== Plot ==
Demetrio Cultrera (Lando Buzzanca), is a young, rich Sicilian bachelor who becomes engaged to the beautiful (and also rich) Rosalba Giordano (Catherine Spaak), daughter of a local business owner Giordano Tuna Company .

After their wedding, Rosalba's attitude changes when she decides to try turning Demetrio into the modern husband she would like.

This causes a problem, as Demetrius prefers sticking to what he sees as more traditional gender roles. Despite her attempts, Rosalba's persistent attempts to convert him to the rituals of high society, enlightened, or feminine tastes do little more than annoy him.

Strongly determined to build a stable relationship with a woman who can fulfill his visions of peaceful married life, he leaves for the Amazon, where he is offered the opportunity to choose and buy a new wife as a slave. The choice falls on the beautiful and docile Manua (Veronica Merin) that he trains to act the way he would like, then proudly shows to friends and to his former wife, attracting curiosity, envy, and his ex-wife's resentment.

== Cast ==
- Lando Buzzanca as Demetrio Cultrera car dealership
- Catherine Spaak as Rosalba Giordano of Giordano tuna enterprise
- Adriana Asti as Elena
- Veronica Merin as Manua, the slave
- Gordon Mitchell as Von Thirac
- Gianni Bonagura as Balzarini
- Paolo Carlini as Manlio
- Renzo Marignano as Corrado
- Corrado Olmi as A passenger leather merchant
- Filippo De Gara as A passenger
- Tom Felleghy as Hotel concierge
- Maria Tedeschi as old passenger
- Mauro Vestri as priest
- Empedocle Buzzanca as mafia boss Don Vincenzo
- Alfonso Giganti as train passenger
- Giuseppe Marrocco as deputy Tacconis
- Empedocle Buzzanca as Mafia's boss
