= European League for Economic Cooperation =

The European League for Economic Cooperation or ELEC (French: Ligue Européenne de Coopération Économique, LECE) is an independent political advocacy group which advocates for closer European integration.

Established in 1946, ELEC was one of the founding members of the European Movement in 1948. It is built as a federation of national sections present in a number of European countries. The membership of its national sections is drawn largely from economic and financial circles; but it also maintains close contacts with senior national and European civil servants as well as academics and policy makers, whose expertise and influence stimulate the exchanges and broaden their scope and quality.

ELEC has advisory status at the Council of Europe and on the United Nations Economic Commission for Europe.

== History ==
The European League for Economic Cooperation was founded in 1946 by Paul Van Zeeland (Belgium), Józef Retinger (Poland) and Pieter Kerstens (the Netherlands). They were rapidly joined by other people such as Edmond Giscard d'Estaing (France), Harold Butler (United Kingdom) and Hermann Abs (Germany).

It has never been a mass movement, although it was present at The Hague in 1948 among the founding organisations of the European Movement.

Open to all ELEC members, there are several working commissions covering various areas of economic activity and cooperation in Europe such as Economic & Social, Mediterranean and Monetary. It is in the commissions that ELEC's essential research is carried out, as well as the drafting of position papers that give rise to various publications. They frequently call on external experts to present the issues which they examine. The Monetary and the Mediterranean commissions organize from time to time conferences, which are open to a larger public, including non-ELEC members.

The "Kronberg Monetary Conference" is ELEC's flagship in this respect. From the very first years of its existence, ELEC showed a keen interest for the monetary aspects of European integration which remained unabated ever since. On 14 July 1956, the Monetary Commission convened for the first time in the Schlosshotel in Kronberg (north of Frankfurt), at Deutsche Bank's invitation and under Hermann J. Abs' presidency, in order to examine the monetary conditions of the common market. It was the first in a long series of yearly gatherings at this same location, stretching almost without interruption for more than half a century. Off the record, prestigious speakers of big European banks, central bank governors, European commissioners and high officials, influential members of the European Parliament, and members of the board of the European Central Bank shared their thoughts with ELEC members, leading to animated discussions. ECB President Jean-Claude Trichet in person was a regular guest of the “Kronberg" meetings.

After 2007, other important European banks took over as a host of this gathering that is still called the “Kronberg” Conference. ING Group hosted a conference on March 5 and 6, 2009, in Amsterdam, and once again on November 13, 2011, in The Hague. Rabo Bank is set to sponsor the next conference.

== Organisation ==
First and foremost, ELEC hinges on its national sections, which enjoy considerable autonomy in recruiting their members, assembling their financial resources and organising their own activities. It is mainly through national sections that members are attracted to ELEC and participate in its national and international activities.

The Central Council, which is ELEC's managing body, brings together twice a year the presidents of national sections in activity and individual members elected for their personal contribution to ELEC, under the leadership of the International President. It alone is empowered to adopt resolutions in ELEC's name and to circulate them by whatever means it chooses. This is also the forum in which the programmes of ELEC's working commissions are debated and approved, and their work evaluated.

Open to all ELEC members, there are several commissions covering various areas of economic activity and cooperation in Europe of which the most important are : Economic & Social, Mediterranean and Monetary. It is in the commissions that ELEC's essential research is carried out, as well as the drafting of position papers that give rise to various publications. They frequently call on external experts to present the issues which they examine.

ELEC is financed through yearly contributions of the national sections.

== Presidents ==
- 1946-1949: Paul van Zeeland
- 1950: Pieter Kerstens
- 1951-1981: René Boël
- 1982-1984: Jean-Charles Snoy et d'Oppuers
- 1985-1999: Daniel Cardon de Lichtbuer
- 2000-2005: Ferdinand Chafart
- 2006-2010: Anton van Rossum
- 2010-: Bernard Snoy et d'Oppuers
