= Antoinette Spaak =

Belgian politician (1928–2020)

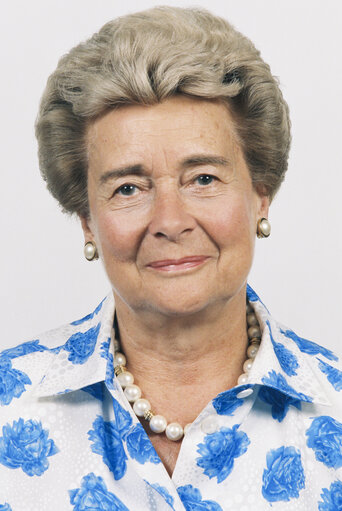

President of the Democratic Front of Francophones
- In office 1977–1982
- Preceded by: Léon Defosset
- Succeeded by: Lucien Outers

Personal details
- Born: 27 June 1928 Etterbeek, Brussels, Belgium
- Died: 28 August 2020 (aged 92) Brussels, Belgium
- Party: FDF (1972–2002); MR (2002–2009)
- Domestic partner: Étienne Davignon
- Education: Free University of Brussels (PhD)

Antoinette Spaak (French pronunciation: [ɑ̃twanɛt spak]; 27 June 1928 – 28 August 2020) was a Belgian politician and leading figure within Francophone and regionalist politics in Brussels. She was born into a noted political family and entered politics as part of the regionalist Democratic Front of Francophones (Front Démocratique des Francophones, FDF) in 1972. She held the presidency of the FDF from 1977 to 1982 and later advocated conciliation between Francophone centrist political parties. This brought the FDF into an electoral coalition ahead of the 1999 election and paved the way for its absorption into the Reformist Movement (Mouvement Réformateur, MR) in 2002. Spaak held various political offices in Belgium and the European Communities until retiring from politics in 2009.

== Early life ==
Spaak was born in the Brussels suburb of Etterbeek in Belgium on 27 June 1928 into a noted political dynasty affiliated with liberal and socialist parties. Her father was Paul-Henri Spaak, a socialist politician and statesman who served several terms as prime minister and who played a notable role in the early years of the European Economic Community (EEC) as well as the North Atlantic Treaty Organization (NATO). She was also the granddaughter of Marie Janson, the first female member of the Belgian Senate, and the grand-niece of Paul-Émile Janson, a liberal politician who would also serve as prime minister. Paul Janson, an influential liberal politician, was her great-grandfather. Spaak studied at the Free University of Brussels and graduated with a doctorate in philosophy and letters.

== Political career ==
Spaak started her career in politics after her father's death in 1972 within the regionalist Democratic Front of Francophones (Front Démocratique des Francophones, FDF), which purported to represent the interests of French-speakers in Brussels amid the ongoing political struggles between linguistic groups in Belgium which had emerged in the 1960s. She was elected to the Chamber of Representatives in the 1974 elections and became president of the FDF in 1977, becoming the first woman in Belgian history to lead a political party. She retained the FDF leadership until 1982 and presided over much of the party's greatest electoral success in the 1970s, when regionalist sentiment in Brussels was at its height. An advocate of European integration, she was voted into the European Parliament in its first direct elections from 1979 to 1984 and again from 1994 to 1999. She was granted the honorary title of Minister of State in 1983. She presided over the Council of the French Community from 1988 to 1992.

As the FDF's electoral fortunes declined in the 1980s, Spaak played a leading role alongside Jean Gol in arguing for conciliation between the FDF and the Liberal Reformist Party (Parti Réformateur Libéral, PRL). This led to an electoral alliance in 1995 between the FDF and the PRL, which was later joined by the Citizens' Movement for Change (Mouvement des Citoyens pour le Changement, MCC). The FDF-PRL-MCC stood a joint list in the 1999 election, which paved the way for the formation of the Reformist Movement (Mouvement Réformateur, MR) in 2002 as a single political party. Spaak was a candidate for the MR in the 2007 elections at the bottom of the list and was not elected. However, she was elected to the Parliament of the Brussels-Capital Region in 2009 but resigned after less than a year. The coalition of interests within the MR collapsed in 2011 amid a dispute on the linguistic status of the region dubbed Brussels-Halle-Vilvoorde, and the FDF seceded, rebranding as DéFI in 2016.

== Personal life ==
Spaak was the long-time partner of Étienne Davignon, a businessman and European functionary, who had been her father's chef de cabinet.

== Death ==
Spaak died at her home in Brussels, Belgium, on 28 August 2020, aged 92. Sophie Wilmès, the incumbent prime minister and MR member, described Spaak on Twitter as a "grande dame". L'Echo said in its obituary that Spaak had "epitomised a certain idea of feminism, of francophone struggle, and European engagement" during her political career but noted that she had never held a ministerial portfolio.

== Books ==
- Van de Woestyne, Francis (2016). Antoinette Spaak: Entretiens avec Francis Van de Woestyne. Brussels: Racine. ISBN 978-2873869847.

Political offices
| Preceded by Jean-Pierre Grafé | President of the Council of the French Community; 1988–1992 | Succeeded by Anne-Marie Corbisier-Hagon |
