= Fernand Spaak =

Belgian lawyer and diplomat

Fernand Paul Jules Spaak (8 August 1923 – 18 July 1981) was a Belgian lawyer and diplomat.

== Life ==
The son of Paul-Henri Spaak and Marguerite Malevez, he was born in Forest and was educated at Trinity College, Cambridge, where he graduated with a BA degree in economics in 1950, and at the Université libre de Bruxelles, receiving a Doctor of Laws from the latter institution.

From 1950 to 1952, he worked for the National Bank of Belgium. In 1952, he became chief of staff to Jean Monnet, president of the High Authority of the European Coal and Steel Community. Then, in 1960, he assumed the position of director general for the Agence d'approvisionnement Euratom. From 1967 to 1975, Spaak was director general for the Directorate-General for Energy (DG XII). From 1976 to 1980, he was delegate for the European Economic Community Executive Commission in the United States.

In April 1981, Spaak initiated the Paul-Henri Spaak Lectures, named in honour of his father, at Harvard University.

In 1953, Spaak married Anna-Maria Farina in London; the couple had three children. His daughter Isabelle became a journalist and author. His sister Antoinette Spaak was head of the Democratic Front of Francophones.

== Death ==
Spaak was shot dead in his flat in Brussels in 1981 by his estranged wife with a hunting rifle; she had previously threatened to kill him on a number of occasions. She then replaced the rifle in its bag and committed suicide by electrocuting herself with an electric iron in a bath.

At the time of his death, Spaak was chief of staff for Gaston Thorn, then president of the European Commission.
