= Spaak method =

The Spaak method of negotiation is named after Paul-Henri Spaak, a Belgian politician, who applied this method at the Intergovernmental Conference on the Common Market and Euratom in 1956 at Val Duchesse castle in preparing for the Treaties of Rome in 1957.

During the negotiations leading to the conference at Val Duchesse, most of the real negotiations took place prior to the actual Intergovernmental Conference (IGC) within the Spaak Committee that was charged with setting the agenda for the Val Duchesse conference. The final report of the committee then formed the basis for the final treaty which was then approved in Rome. Within this negotiating method, the preparatory committee had a strong initiating and brokerage role in the phase preceding the conference, while the actual Intergovernmental Conference only dealt with negotiating small changes in the original agenda prepared by the preparatory committee.

This method was also applied to the preparation of the Economic and Monetary Union (EMU) by the Delors Committee.

== See also ==
- Messina Conference
- Sherpa (emissary)

== Sources ==
- 50th anniversary of the Val Duchesse negotiations of the Rome Treaties (1956–2006)
- Towards a new method of constitutional bargaining?
