= Paul van Zeeland =

Belgian lawyer, economist, Catholic politician and statesman

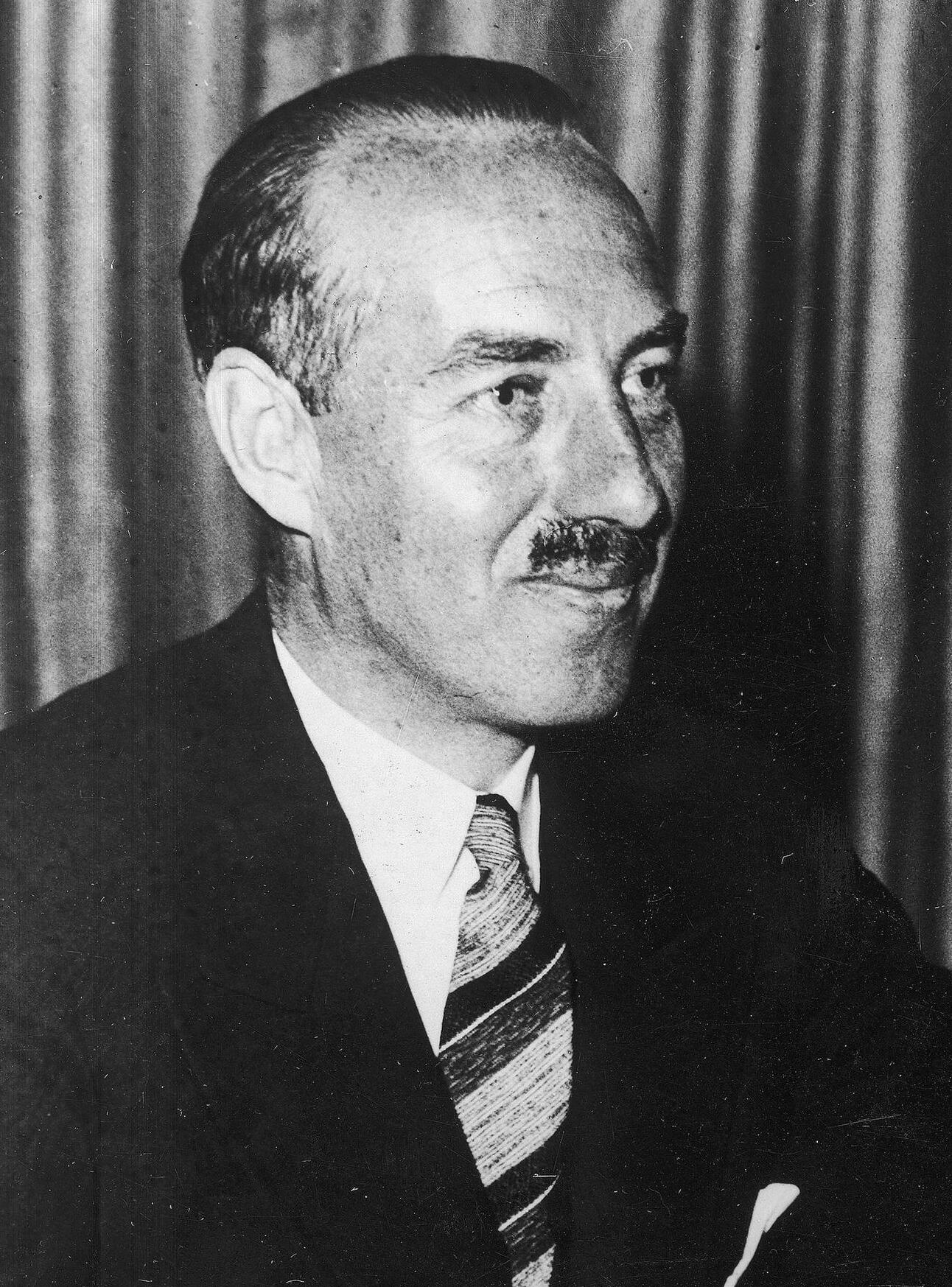
- Van Zeeland in 1937

Prime Minister of Belgium
- In office 25 March 1935 – 23 November 1937
- Monarch: Leopold III
- Preceded by: Georges Theunis
- Succeeded by: Paul-Emile Janson

Personal details
- Born: Paul Guillaume van Zeeland; 11 November 1893; Soignies, Belgium
- Died: 22 September 1973 (aged 79); City of Brussels, Belgium
- Political party: Catholic Party

Paul Guillaume, Viscount van Zeeland (11 November 1893 – 22 September 1973) was a Belgian lawyer, economist, Catholic politician and statesman who served as Prime Minister of Belgium from 1935 to 1937.

== Biography ==
van Zeeland was born in Soignies. He was a professor of law and later director of the Institute of Economic Science at the Catholic University of Leuven (Leuven), and vice-governor of the National Bank of Belgium.

In March 1935, he became the Prime Minister of a government of national unity (a coalition comprising the three major parties: Catholics, Liberals and Socialists). Given decree powers, he abated a national economic crisis by devaluing the currency and implementing expansive budgetary policies.

van Zeeland's government resigned in the spring of 1936 due to the agitation of Rexism, a Belgian fascist movement. On 24 May 1936, general elections were held. The Labour party won 70 of 202 seats (minus 3), Zeeland's Catholic Party 61 seats (minus 18) and the new Rexists 21 seats. Van Zeeland continued as Prime Minister leading a government of national unity, composed of the three major parties (Catholics, Socialists and Liberals).

On 2 June 1936, a wildcat strike among dockworkers in the Port of Antwerp broke out and quickly spread to other industrial regions without the endorsement of the country's major trades unions. It was characterised by the new tactic of workplace occupations. The Belgian strike was unusual in uniting socialist and Catholic trade union federations in support. van Zeeland agreed to convene a "National Labour Conference" (Conférence Nationale du Travail) on 17 June 1936 to bring together trade union and company representatives. It brokered a compromise agreement including the introduction of a legal minimum wage, six days' paid holidays, and a maximum 40-hour working week for workers in particular industrial occupations. The strike formally ended on 2 July 1936.

Several other reforms affecting labour were carried out during the course of van Zeeland's premiership.

After proclaiming martial law, his second government suppressed the Rexists. It introduced measures against unemployment, which helped ease the political tensions. Also during his second term, Belgium gave up its military alliance with France and reverted to its traditional policy of neutrality, now dubbed a "policy of independence".

In spring 1937, Rexist leader Léon Degrelle accused van Zeeland of having received money from the Belgian Nation Bank. van Zeeland denied this, but a commission found out he had received 330.000 bfr. He resigned as Prime Minister on 23 November, and the king named Paul-Emile Janson as his successor.

In 1939, van Zeeland became president of the Committee on Refugees, established in London, and was made High Commissioner for repatriating displaced Belgians in 1944. He was elected to the American Philosophical Society in 1942. In 1946, he was one of the founders of the European League for Economic Cooperation.

After the war, van Zeeland served as Minister of Foreign Affairs in several Catholic governments between 1949 and 1954 and as economic advisor to the Belgian government and to the council of ministers of the North Atlantic Treaty Organisation. He was Honorary Secretary General of the Steering Committee of the Bilderberg meeting. In 1956, he finally retired from politics and became chairman of the Banque Belge d'Afrique.

In 2013, to the consternation of his family, it was discovered that he had founded a Panamanian offshore company in 1946.

== See also ==
- Belgian general strike of 1936

Political offices
Preceded by Georges Theunis	Prime Minister of Belgium; 1935–1937	Succeeded by Paul-Emile Janson
Diplomatic posts
New office	President of the European League for Economic Cooperation; 1946–1949	Succeeded by Pieter Kerstens
