= Vic Anciaux =

Belgian doctor and politician (1931–2023)

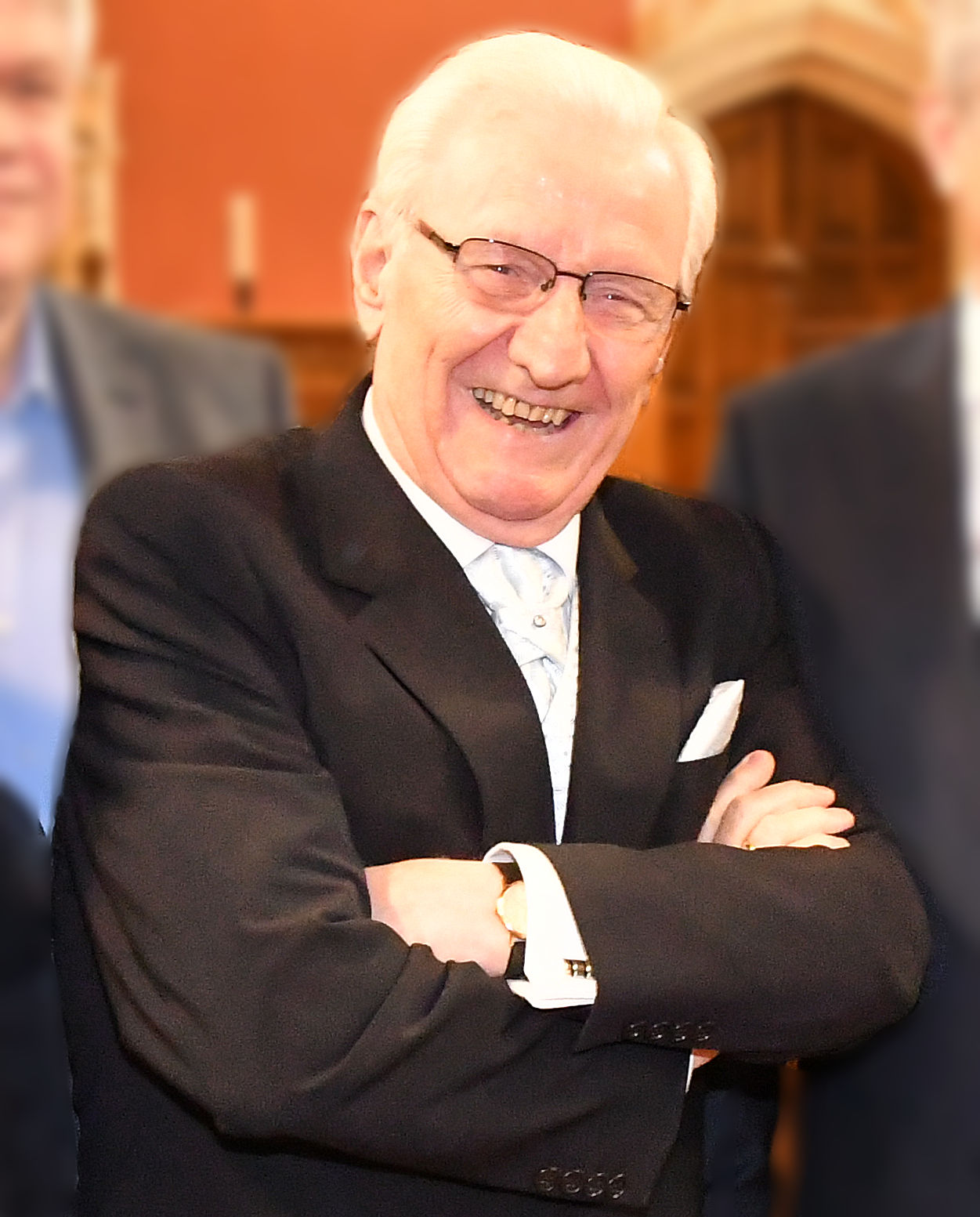
- Anciaux in 2017

Member of the Chamber of Representatives of Belgium
- In office 23 May 1965 – 20 May 1995

Member of the Flemish Council
- In office 7 December 1971 – 20 May 1995

Personal details
- Born: Victor Anciaux; 24 December 1931 Boechout, Belgium
- Died: 24 February 2023 (aged 91)
- Party: VU
- Education: KU Leuven
- Occupation: Doctor

Victor Anciaux (24 December 1931 – 24 February 2023) was a Belgian doctor and politician. A member of the People's Union, he served in the Chamber of Representatives from 1965 to 1995.

Anciaux died on 24 February 2023, at the age of 91.
