= Paul-Henri Spaak Foundation =

Belgian organisation

The Paul-Henri Spaak Foundation or Fondation Paul-Henri Spaak located in Brussels (Belgium) was founded in 1973, one year after the death Paul-Henri Spaak, to continue his work on European integration and transatlantic relations. The Foundation organises conferences and seminars, which are published and possesses a major part of Paul-Henri Spaak's archives. Viscount Étienne Davignon is the president of the Foundation.

== Background ==
In 1945, Paul-Henri Spaak was elected chairman of the first session of the General Assembly of the United Nations. In 1956, he was chosen by the Council of the North Atlantic Treaty Organisation and he held this office from 1957 until 1961. Paul-Henri Spaak was one of the Founding fathers of the European Union and the first President of the European Parliament (Common Assembly).

== See also ==
- Euro-American relations

== Sources ==
- Paul-Henri Spaak archive
