= Palmencrona =

- Coat of arms of Palmencrona
- Country: Sweden
- Founded: 1718
- Founder: Lars Palmencrona (1670-1724)
- Final ruler: Bryngel Palmencrona (1689-1725)
- Dissolution: 1790 (1725)

Palmencrona was a Swedish noble family from Gothenburg, Sweden. Captain Lars Palmencrona (1670-1724), his wife Ingrid Palmencrona (née Bagge) (1660-1721) as well as her issue were ennobled (No. 1559) in 1718 by King Charles XII.
