= Isabelle Spaak =

Belgian writer (born 1960)

Isabelle Spaak (born 5 October 1960) is a Belgian writer living in Paris.

The daughter of Fernand Spaak and Anna-Maria Farina, she was born in Brussels and grew up there. In July 1981, her mother killed her father and then committed suicide. Spaak moved to France later that year, attending Paris West University Nanterre La Défense. She went on to work as a journalist for VSD; later, she was put in charge of the culture pages of Le Parisien Magazine.

She is perhaps best known for two autobiographical novels Ça ne se fait pas (2004), which received the Prix Victor-Rossel, and Pas du tout mon genre (2006). In 2011, she published Militants, a non-fiction work on the French Socialist party. Spaak published a third novel Une allure folle, based on the lives of her mother and grandmother, in 2016.

== Publications ==
- Paris, 1999
- Ça ne se fait pas : roman, 2004
- Pas du tout mon genre : roman, 2006
- Militants, 2011
- Une allure folle : roman, 2016
- Une mère, etc., 2019
