= Bagge family =

Bagge
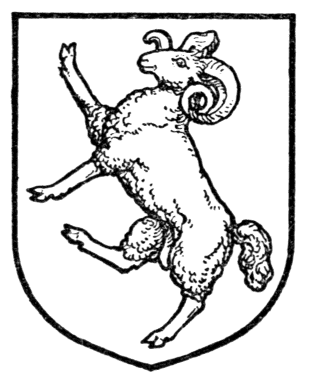
- Approximate rendering of recurrent ram rampant charge in Bagge coats of arms.
- Cadet branches: Bagge af Holmegaard; Samuel Bagge

The Bagge family is a Swedish noble family, originally of Norwegian origin from Marstrand, Bohuslän, by Nils Fredriksson Bagge, burgher and mayor of Marstrand in the 17th century. According to Danmarks Adels Aarbog, the yearbook of the Danish Nobility, ennobled Sea Captain Peder Bagge was issued from the family.

== Notable members ==
- Fredrik Bagge (1646–1713)
- Peter Bagge (1710–1779), merchant, Member of the Riksdag
- Christian Bagge (1722–1773), Swedish consul in Tripoli
- Peter Bagge (1743–1819), forge patron
- Daniel Benjamin Bagge (1769–1836)
- Samuel Bagge (1774–1814), engineer, major
- Martin Bagge (1790–1856)
- Jonas Bagge (1800–1869)
- Jonas Samuel Bagge (1803–1870)
- Julius Bagge (1844–1890)
- Peter Fredrik Leo Bagge (1850–1926)

== Cadet branches ==
Coat of arms of Bagge af Holmegaard with lindworm charge.

=== Bagge af Holmegaard ===
One branch through Peder Bagge was conferred Danish nobility in 1582 for war deeds.

=== Samuel Bagge ===
The engineer, Major Samuel Bagge made contributions to several national engineering endeavours, including the Göta Canal. In the Revolution of 1809 he served as an envoy between the parties of Herman Wedel Jarlsberg/Charles August, Crown Prince of Sweden, and Georg Adlersparre/Baltzar von Platen. Samuel Bagge was conferred Swedish nobility in 1814, but went under water in a storm in Vättern the same year. A street bears his name in Lerum, Västra Götaland County.
