= Swedish Customs Service =

- Common name: Swedish Customs, "Tullen"
- Motto: Bara godkända varor över gränsen Only approved goods make it across the border

Agency overview
- Formed: 1636
- Employees: ~2,000 (2020)
- Annual budget: SEK 2.1 billion (2020)
- Legal personality: Governmental: Government agency

Jurisdictional structure
- National agency: Sweden
- Operations jurisdiction: Sweden
- Primary governing body: Riksdag
- Secondary governing body: Ministry of Finance
- Constituting instruments: Customs Act (2016:253); The Customs Ordinance (2016:287); Ordinance (2016:1332) containing instructions for the Swedish Customs
- Specialist jurisdiction: Customs, excise, gambling

Operational structure
- Headquarters: Stockholm, Sweden
- Minister responsible: Elisabeth Svantesson, Minister of Finance
- Agency executive: Charlotte Svensson (2018), Director-General of Swedish Customs

Website
- www.tullverket.se/en

The Swedish Customs Service (Swedish: Tullverket, lit. 'customs administration') is the customs service of the Kingdom of Sweden. It is a department of the Government of Sweden. It is one of the oldest governmental agencies in Sweden, as it was founded in 1636.

== History ==
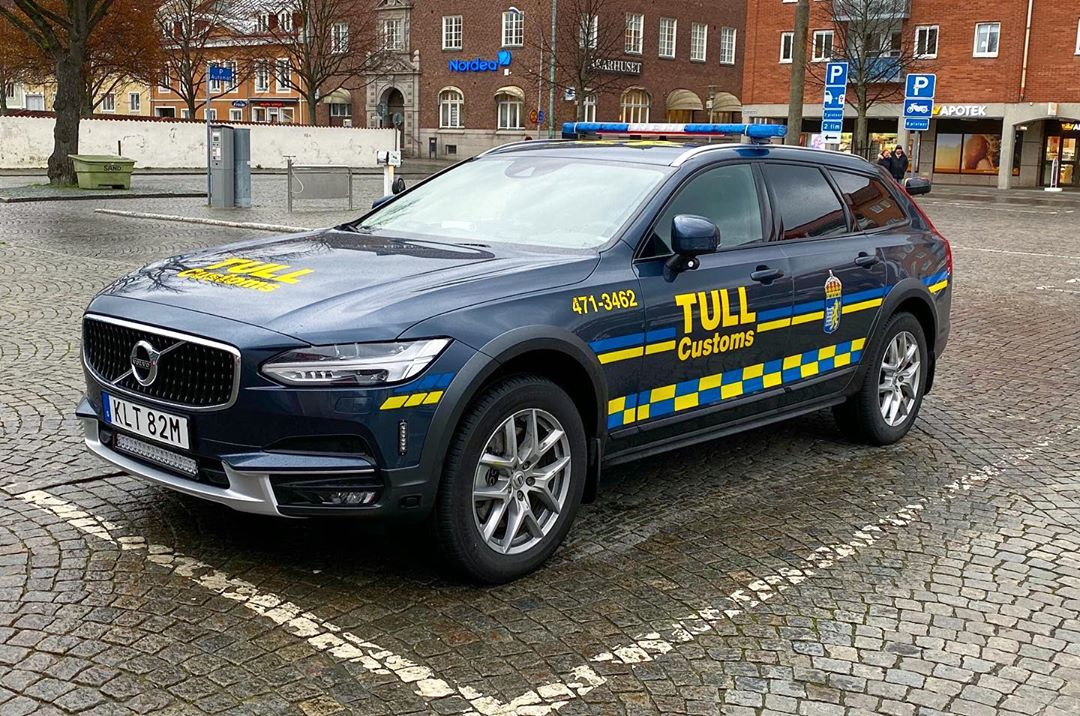
Volvo V90 patrol unit of the Swedish Customs

Customs duties have existed in Sweden since the twelfth century, and the current organisation was created in 1636. During this period, the Swedish administration was being developed as Sweden was then a great power. The first Collector-General or Head of Customs was Mårten Augustinsson.

Customs duties, known as "fiscal tolls", were first introduced to raise revenue for the state. Other tolls were introduced later to protect Swedish industry, so-called "protective tariffs". In earlier times, most goods were transported by sea. Vessels arriving in Sweden had to pass through the "Great Sea Toll" where customs duties were paid. There was also a domestic toll, known as the "Little Toll". In the case of the Little Toll, Swedes were forced to pay duty on goods they brought into towns to sell, an important source of income for the Swedish monarchy.

In line with the arrival of duties, so came the rise of smuggling. Different goods have been smuggled at different times. From the 18th Century to the mid 19th Century, it was common to smuggle cloth. This was because the government was keen to encourage a textiles industry in Sweden and introduced customs duties and an import ban to prevent foreign cloth coming into the country. In the period between the two world wars, 1920–1939, alcohol was the item most smuggled. From the 1960s drug smuggling started to become a problem in Sweden, and remains one today.

Another clear trend is the growing trade with other countries with the aid of new technology, such as the internet. Goods ordered from countries outside the EU through the internet are also subject to duty and other charges.

Upon joining the European Union in 1995, Sweden also joined the EU customs union, which means the customs regulations are standardised throughout the EU. The joint customs union is slightly different from that of the Schengen Area covering free-travel.

== Current role ==
Approximately 75 million travellers, ships, containers and vehicles cross Sweden's frontiers every year. Swedish Customs works in the midst of this flow of goods and people.

The work of Swedish Customs within the law enforcement field extends across the entire chain of a criminal investigation, from intelligence and checks at the customs channel to a completed preliminary investigation. Border protection officers, customs investigators and customs prosecutors work together to combat criminal activity. Customs officers have the right to stop and search individuals, interview, investigate and to search premises. Customs officers can also be trained to be a Search Dog handler. When the dog retires, at about 10 years of age, the customs officer is offered the dog as a gift, and then can continue, either as a dog handler with another dog, a dog handling instructor, or a regular customs officer.

Alongside law enforcement there are many officers who work in the legal flow to ensure that customs duties and taxes are paid correctly and in time. This work involves not only collecting duties but also the supervising of customs warehouses, special procedures, import or export licenses and authorisations necessary for the declared goods. Furthermore, Swedish Customs have a role to help other authorities to collect certain information e.g. to produce trade statistics on import and export. This is usually done via the Customs declarations which are processed when goods are released through Customs.

== Ranks ==
General Customs Director	Director General	Head of Department	Chief of Operations Management	Head of Border Department	Deputy Head of Border Department
Commanding Officer	Group Chief	Deputy Group Chief	Customs Inspector, 5 years	Customs Inspector	Customs Trainee
