= Marie Janson =

Belgian politician (1873–1960)

- Born: 23 July 1873; Brussels, Belgium
- Died: 8 March 1960 (aged 86); Uccle, Brussels, Belgium
- Occupation: politician
- Known for: first female Belgian senator
- Political party: Belgian Labour Party; Belgian Socialist Party

Marie Janson (23 July 1873 – 8 March 1960) was a Belgian politician and the first woman to serve in the Belgian senate. She was a daughter of Paul Janson and Anna-Augustine Amoré.

Born in Brussels, her father Paul Janson was leading member of the progressive wing of the Belgian liberal movement and founder of the Fédération progressiste. Her brother Paul-Émile Janson served as Prime Minister of Belgium. Marie's mother, Anna-Augustine Amoré was a well-educated woman of middle-origins who had worked as teacher at Isabelle Gatti de Gamond's school before her marriage; Marie herself was educated there.

On 22 July 1894, she married lawyer and playwright Paul Spaak. The couple had four children, of whom Paul-Henri Spaak, later Belgian Prime Minister like his uncle Paul-Émile, was the most famous.

During the First World War Marie was active in social work and this led her to join the Socialist Party. She was elected to the municipal council of Saint-Gilles in 1921, and the same year was selected by the party's executive, led by Émile Vandervelde, to serve in the Belgian Senate. She continued to serve as a co-opted senator until 1958. Her long service led to her presiding over the opening of the Senate on 11 November 1952.

Her granddaughter Antoinette Spaak followed in her footsteps, achieving another first: first woman to lead a Belgian political party, the Democratic Front of Francophones.
