= Paul-Émile Janson =

Belgian politician (1872–1944)

- Portrait of Paul-Émile Janson

Prime Minister of Belgium
- In office 23 November 1937 – 15 May 1938
- Monarch: Leopold III
- Preceded by: Paul van Zeeland
- Succeeded by: Paul-Henri Spaak

Personal details
- Born: 30 May 1872 Brussels, Belgium
- Died: 3 March 1944 (aged 71) Buchenwald concentration camp, Germany
- Party: Liberal Party
- Education: Free University of Brussels

Paul-Émile (Paul Emil) Janson (30 May 1872 – 3 March 1944) was a francophone Belgian liberal politician who served as the Prime Minister of Belgium from 1937 to 1938. During the German occupation, he was arrested as a political prisoner and died in a German concentration camp in 1944.

== Biography ==
Born in Brussels, Janson was the son of liberal statesman Paul Janson (died 1913). He studied law at the Free University of Brussels (now split into the Université libre de Bruxelles and the Vrije Universiteit Brussel), practised as a lawyer, and also taught at the university.

=== Political career ===
Janson was elected as a liberal to the Belgian Chamber of Representatives in 1910. He was not re-elected in 1912, but he was again elected in 1914. He held various minister posts, including War (1920), Justice (1927–1931; 1932–1934; 1939, 1940) and minister without portfolio (1940–1944). He was made an honorary minister of state in 1931.

He served as the 30th prime minister of Belgium in 1937–1938. In the early part of the Second World War, Janson served as foreign minister, and as minister without portfolio, in the government of Hubert Pierlot. He remained in France when the government in exile moved to London. In 1943 he was detained by the occupying German forces and incarcerated in Buchenwald concentration camp. He died there in 1944.

His sister Marie Janson was the first woman to be elected to the Chamber of Representatives in 1921 and the mother of Paul-Henri Spaak, Janson's nephew and the man who directly succeeded him as prime minister in 1938.

== Honours ==
- Minister of state, by Royal Decree.
- Commander in the Order of Leopold.

== Commemoration ==
- A street in Ixelles is named Rue Paul Emile Janson in his honour.
- The Université libre de Bruxelles has an auditorium named after him.
- a subway (metro) station in Charleroi is named after him.

== See also ==
- Liberal Party

== Sources ==
- D'Ydewalle, Ch., Silhouettes politiques : Paul-Emile Janson, in : Revue Générale, LXII, 1929, p. 86–90.
- Miroir, A., in : Parisel, W., Histoire de La Loge Les Vrais amis de l'Union et du Progrès Réunis 1892–1980, Brussel, 1980, p. 283–285.
- Stengers, J., Paul-Emile Janson, in : Académie Royale de Belgique, Bulletin de la Commission des Lettres et des Sciences Morales et Politiques, 5e série, LIX, 1973–1976, p. 202–281.

Political offices
Preceded by Paul van Zeeland	Prime Minister of Belgium; 1937–1938	Succeeded by Paul-Henri Spaak
