= Jean-Pierre Grafé =

Belgian politician and lawyer (1932–2019)

- Born: 31 March 1932; Liège, Belgium
- Died: 16 May 2019 (aged 87)
- Occupation: Politician

Jean-Pierre Marie Jacques Grafé (31 March 1932 – 16 May 2019) was a Belgian politician and a member of the Christian Social Party (PSC), and then the Human Democratic Centre.

== Biography ==
Jean-Pierre Grafé is the son of Jacques Grafé, a lawyer in Liège, and the grandson of Alfred Grafé, a professor at the University of Liège.

Grafé earned a doctorate in law from the University of Liège.

He served as a member of the Belgian Chamber of Representatives from 7 November 1971 to 12 April 1995 for the PSC. He was also the Minister of Affairs of Wallonia from 1973 to 1974.

He was Regional Councillor for the Liège District from 15 October 1980 to 31 July 1995.

Grafé served as Secretary of State for Wallonia from 6 November 1980 to 6 October 1981.

He was elected as a Member of Parliament in 1999 and served until 2003. Grafé retired from politics in 2012.

Jean-Pierre Grafé died of cancer on 16 May 2019.
