= Paul Janson =

Belgian politician (1840–1913)

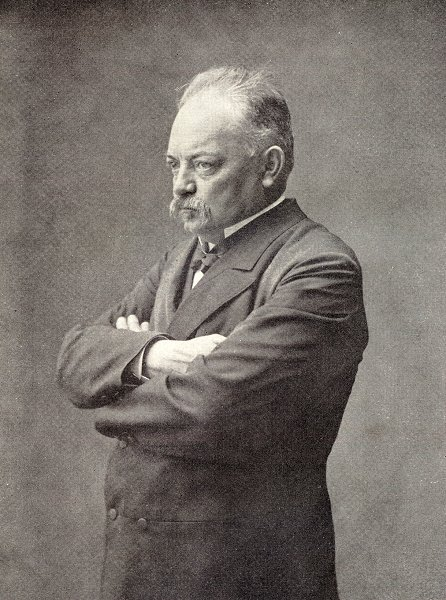
- Paul Janson
- Born: 11 April 1840; Herstal, Belgium
- Died: 19 April 1913 (aged 73); Brussels, Belgium
- Occupation: politician

Paul Janson (11 April 1840 – 19 April 1913) was a Belgian liberal politician.

Born in Herstal in the Province of Liège, Janson studied philosophy and law at the Free University of Brussels. From an early age he was a strong supporter of electoral reform and stood on the progressive wing of the Belgian liberal movement. A modern study suggests that only "his visceral rejection of the class struggle" kept him from the burgeoning socialist movement.

Janson was elected to the Belgian Chamber of Representatives for the Liberal Party in 1877, but was not re-elected in 1884. That year he became a local councillor in Brussels. Re-elected in 1889, he continued to agitate for universal suffrage, having established the Fédération progressiste of liberals who shared this, and other progressive goals. Universal male suffrage, albeit with plural vote, was introduced following a general strike in 1893.

In his later years he favoured electoral co-operation with the Socialist Party. He was appointed an honorary Minister of State on 14 August 1912.

Paul Janson was the father of future Prime Minister of Belgium Paul-Émile Janson and Marie Janson (later Spaak), first female member of the Belgian parliament, mother of Prime Minister Paul-Henri Spaak.
