= Kalergi Plan =

Far-right antisemitic conspiracy theory

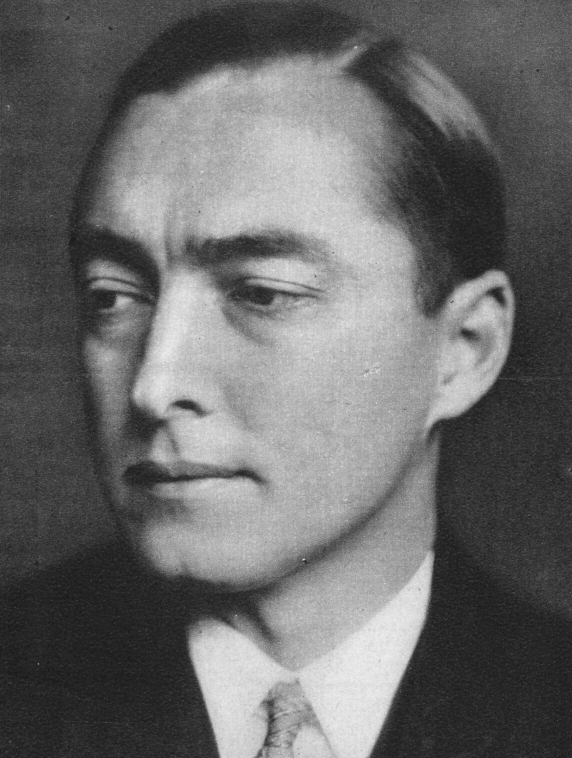
Richard von Coudenhove-Kalergi, supposed creator of the plan, pictured c. 1930

The Kalergi Plan, sometimes called the Coudenhove-Kalergi Conspiracy, is a far-right, antisemitic conspiracy theory. The theory claims that Austrian-Japanese politician Richard von Coudenhove-Kalergi, creator of the Paneuropean Union, concocted a plot to mix and replace white Europeans with other races via immigration. The conspiracy theory is most often associated with European groups and parties, but it has also spread to North American politics.

Memes promoting the conspiracy theory often incorporate misrepresentations of Kalergi's writings, such as the false claim he stated that Jews shall rule over Europe. The conspiracy theory stems from a section of Kalergi's 1925 book Praktischer Idealismus ("Practical Idealism") in which he predicted the rise of a mixed race of the future with "Eurasian-Negroid" features, similar in its appearance to the Ancient Egyptians.

== Origins ==
The conspiracy theory stems from a section of Kalergi's 1925 book Praktischer Idealismus ("Practical Idealism"), in which he predicted that a mixed race of the future would arise: "The man of the future will be of mixed race. Today's races and castes will gradually disappear owing to the vanishing of space, time, and prejudice. The Eurasian-Negroid race of the future, similar in its appearance to the Ancient Egyptians, will replace the diversity of peoples with a diversity of personalities." Modern far-right individuals seek to draw relationships between contemporary European policy-making and this quote.

Austrian neo-Nazi writer Gerd Honsik wrote about the subject in his book Kalergi Plan (2005).

== The conspiracy theory ==
According to Hope not Hate, an anti-racism advocacy group, it is a version of the racist white genocide conspiracy theory.

The independent Italian newspaper Linkiesta investigated the conspiracy theory and described it as a hoax which is comparable to the fabricated antisemitic document The Protocols of the Elders of Zion. The Southern Poverty Law Center describes the Kalergi plan as a distinctly European way of pushing the white genocide conspiracy theory on the continent, with white nationalists quoting Coudenhove-Kalergi's writings out of context in order to assert that the European Union's immigration policies were insidious plots that were hatched decades ago in order to destroy white people. The theory alleges that Coudenhove-Kalergi intended to influence Europe's policies on immigration in order to create a "populace devoid of identity" which would then supposedly be ruled by a Jewish elite.

Memes promoting the conspiracy theory often incorporate misreadings of Kalergi's writing, such as the false claim that Jews shall rule over Europe.

== Recent history ==
In 2019, the right-wing nonprofit organization Turning Point USA posted a photograph on Twitter in which a person was holding a beach ball that featured text promoting this conspiracy theory. The tweet was deleted soon after. In 2026, an ITV News investigation into the far-right Reform UK party revealed a campaigner for the party promoting the theory.

== See also ==
- Great Replacement
- The Camp of the Saints
- Miscegenation hoax
- Demographic engineering
