= Race of the future =

Theoretical composite race which will result from ongoing racial admixture

The race of the future is a theoretical composite race which would result from the ongoing racial admixture.

Richard von Coudenhove-Kalergi in 1925 in Practical Idealism predicted: "The man of the future will be of mixed race. Today's races and classes will gradually disappear owing to the vanishing of space, time, and prejudice. The Eurasian-Negroid race of the future will replace the diversity of peoples with a diversity of individuals." Kalergi's statement has subsequently been utilized as a part of the white-supremacist Kalergi Plan conspiracy theory.

The same scenario had been envisaged, with rather less enthusiasm, by Madison Grant in his 1916 The Passing of the Great Race, calling for a eugenics program to prevent this development, and in a similar ideological context in Lothrop Stoddard's The Rising Tide of Color Against White World-Supremacy in 1920.

== History ==
Gottfried de Purucker was an author and theosophist who, when asked about intermarriage in 1930, said:

In answering your question very briefly, I can say simply this, that the time has not come when I would willingly suggest intermarriage; but I am in honesty bound to qualify that by saying that the race of the future will be a composite, composed of the many different races on earth today. Let us also remember that all men are ultimately of one blood.

The word miscegenation was used in an anonymous propaganda pamphlet printed in New York City in late 1863, entitled Miscegenation: The Theory of the Blending of the Races, Applied to the American White Man and Negro. The pamphlet purported to be in favor of interbreeding of whites and blacks until the races were indistinguishably mixed as mulattos, claiming that this was the goal of the United States Republican Party. The real authors were David Goodman Croly, managing editor of the New York World, a Democratic Party paper, and George Wakeman, a World reporter. The pamphlet soon was exposed as an attempt to discredit the Republicans, the Lincoln administration, and the abolitionist movement by exploiting the fears and racial biases common among whites. Nonetheless, this pamphlet and variations on it were reprinted widely in communities on both sides of the American Civil War by opponents of Republicans.

The Province of Maryland passed the first anti-miscegenation law in colonial America in 1664. In the 18th, 19th, and early 20th century, many American states passed anti-miscegenation laws, often based on controversial interpretations of the Bible, particularly the story of Phinehas. Typically a felony, these laws prohibited the solemnization of weddings between persons of different races and prohibited the officiating of such ceremonies. Sometimes the individuals attempting to marry would not be held guilty of miscegenation itself, but felony charges of adultery or fornication would be brought against them instead. Connecticut, New Hampshire, New York, New Jersey, Vermont, Wisconsin, Minnesota, Alaska, Hawaii, and the federal District of Columbia did not pass anti-miscegenation laws. In 1883, the constitutionality of anti-miscegenation laws was upheld by the U.S. Supreme Court in Pace v. Alabama.

In 1948, the California Supreme Court in Perez v. Sharp effectively repealed the California anti-miscegenation statutes, thereby making California the first state in the twentieth century to do so. In 1967, the remaining anti-miscegenation laws in 16 states were declared unconstitutional by the Supreme Court in Loving v. Virginia.

== Theosophy ==
William Quan Judge was a 19th-century theosophist who wrote in his book Echoes from the Orient

We are preparing here in America a new race which will exhibit the perfection of the glories that I said were being slowly brought to the surface from the long forgotten past ... Here, and nowhere else, are to be found men and women of every race living together, being governed together, attacking nature and the problems of life together, and bringing forth children who combine, each one, two races. This process will go on until in the course of many generations there will be produced on the American continents an entirely new race; new bodies; new orders of intellect; new powers of the mind.

== See also ==
- Goobacks, an episode of South Park featuring mixed-race people from the future
- Interracial marriage
- La Raza Cósmica
- Melting pot
- Mestizo
- Multiculturalism
- Multiracial
- Pardo
- Racial hygiene
