= White genocide conspiracy theory =

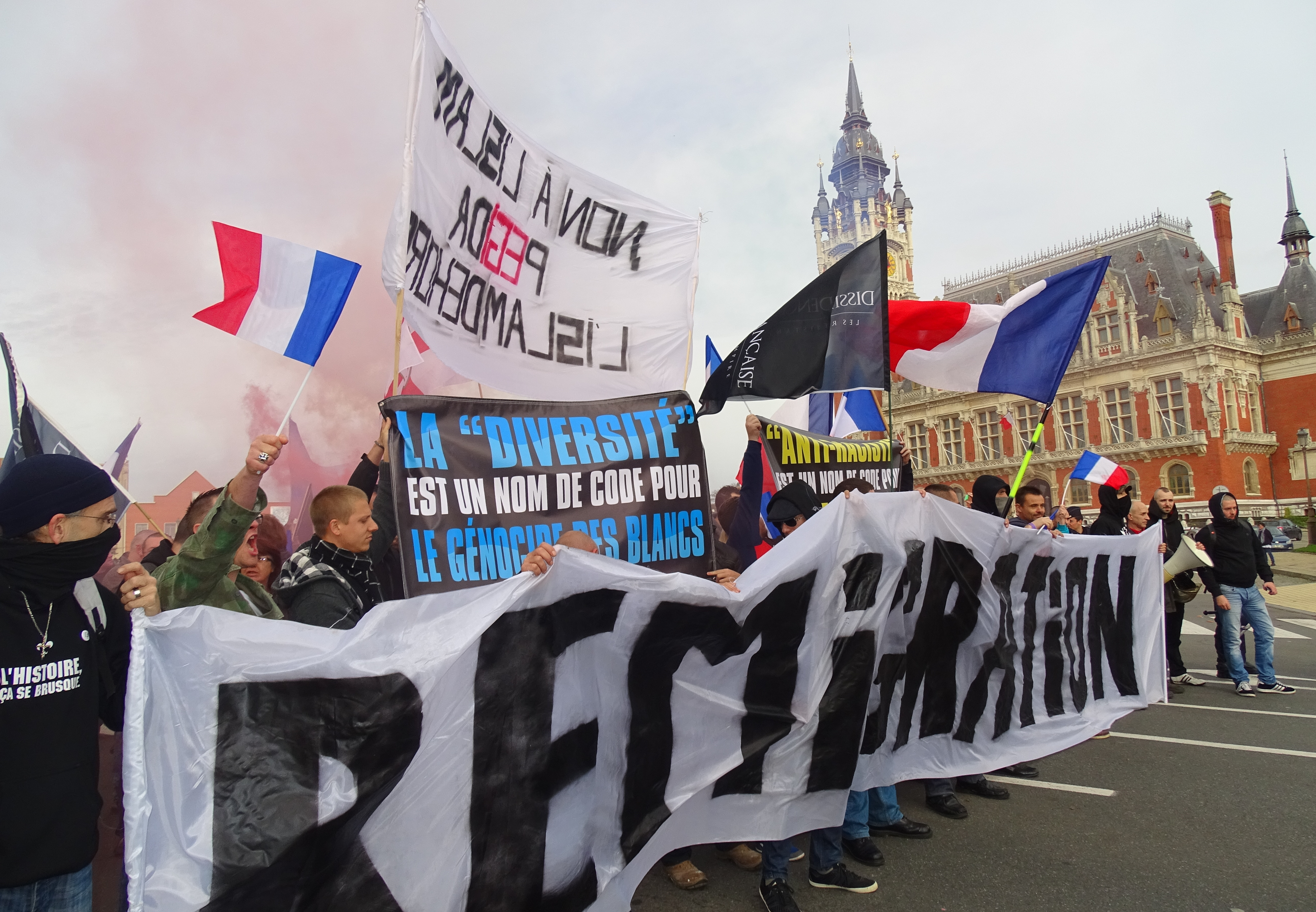
Anti-immigrant protesters in Calais hold a sign in French reading "Diversity is a code word for white genocide", above a banner calling for remigration (8 November 2015).

The white genocide, white extinction, or white replacement conspiracy theory is a white nationalist conspiracy theory that claims there is a deliberate plot to cause the extinction of white people through forced assimilation, mass immigration, or violent genocide. It purports that this goal is advanced through the promotion of miscegenation, interracial marriage, mass non-white immigration, assimilation of immigrants, racial integration, low fertility rates, abortion, pornography, LGBTQ identities, governmental land-confiscation from whites, organized violence, and eliminationism in majority white countries. Under some theories, black people, non-white Hispanics, South Asians, Southeast Asians, and Arabs are blamed for the secret plot, but usually as more fertile immigrants, invaders, parasites, or violent aggressors, instead of the masterminds. The plot is often blamed on Jews. A related, but distinct, conspiracy theory is the Great Replacement.

White genocide is a political myth based on pseudoscience, pseudohistory, and ethnic hatred, and is driven by a psychological panic often termed "white extinction anxiety". Objectively, white people are not dying out or facing extermination. The purpose of the conspiracy theory is to justify a commitment to a white nationalist agenda in support of calls to violence.

The theory was popularized by white separatist neo-Nazi David Lane around 1995, and has been leveraged as propaganda in Europe, North America, South Africa, and Australia. Similar conspiracy theories were prevalent in Nazi Germany and have been used in the present day interchangeably with, and as a broader and more extreme version of, Renaud Camus's 2011 The Great Replacement, focusing on the white population of France. Since the 2019 Christchurch and El Paso shootings, of which the shooters' manifestos decried a "white replacement" and have referenced the concept of "Great Replacement", Camus's conspiracy theory (often called "replacement theory" or "population replacement"), along with Bat Ye'or's 2002 Eurabia concept and Gerd Honsik's resurgent 1970s myth of a Kalergi Plan, have all been used synonymously with "white genocide" and are increasingly referred to as variations of the conspiracy theory.

In August 2018, United States president Donald Trump was accused of endorsing the conspiracy theory in a foreign policy tweet instructing Secretary of State Mike Pompeo to investigate South African "land and farm seizures and expropriations and the large scale killing of farmers", claiming that the "South African government is now seizing land from white farmers". Unsubstantiated claims that the South African farm attacks on farmers disproportionately target whites are a key element of the conspiracy theory, portrayed in media as a form of gateway or proxy issue to "white genocide" within the wider context of the Western world. The topic of farm seizures in South Africa and Zimbabwe has been a rallying cry of white nationalists and alt-right groups who use it to justify their vision of white supremacy. In 2025, Trump openly claimed there was a white genocide in South Africa.

== History ==
The idea of a distinct white human race can be argued to have begun in 1758, when Swedish biologist Carl Linnaeus proposed what he considered to be natural taxonomic categories of the human species. He distinguished between Homo sapiens and Homo sapiens europaeus, and he later added four geographical subdivisions of humans: white Europeans, red Americans, yellow Asians and black Africans.

=== Background ===
==== France ====
The idea of a "replacement" of white people under the guidance of a hostile elite can be further traced back to pre-WWII antisemitic conspiracy theories which posited the existence of a Jewish plot to destroy Europe through miscegenation, especially in Édouard Drumont's antisemitic bestseller La France juive (1886). Commenting on this resemblance, historian Nicolas Lebourg and political scientist Jean-Yves Camus suggest that Renaud Camus's contribution in The Great Replacement (2011) was to replace the antisemitic elements with a clash of civilizations between Muslims and Europeans.

In the late 19th century, imperialist politicians invoked the Péril jaune (Yellow Peril) in their negative comparisons of France's low birth-rate and the high birth-rates of Asian countries. From that claim arose an artificial, cultural fear that immigrant-worker Asians soon would "flood" France. This danger supposedly could be successfully countered only by increased fecundity of French women. Then, France would possess enough soldiers to thwart the eventual flood of immigrants from Asia. Maurice Barrès's nationalist writings of that period have also been noted in the ideological genealogy of the "Great Replacement", Barrès contending both in 1889 and in 1900 that a replacement of the native population under the combined effect of immigration and a decline in the birth rate was happening in France.

==== Eugenics ====
The conspiracy theory had precursors in early 20th-century eugenics theories, which were popular in white-majority countries such as Australia and New Zealand, where it was feared that non-white immigrants would eventually supplant the white population.

==== Madison Grant in the United States ====
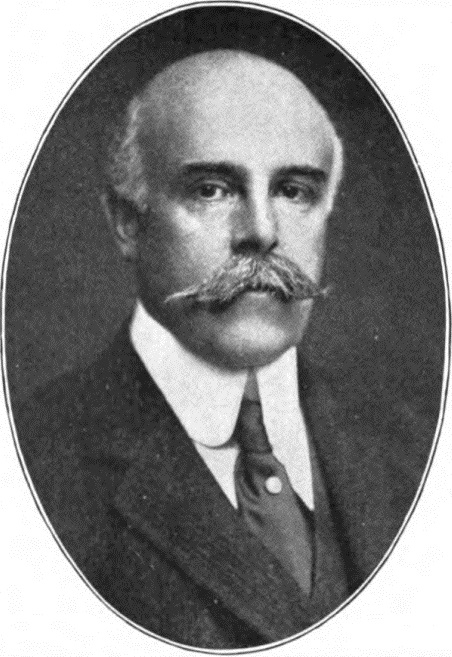
Madison Grant

In 1916, the American eugenicist and lawyer Madison Grant wrote a book entitled The Passing of the Great Race which, while largely ignored when it first appeared, went through four editions, becoming part of popular culture in 1920s America and, in the process, spawned the ideology that the founding-stock of the United States, the so-called Nordic race, were under extinction threats from assimilation with non-whites. Grant wrote of it:

Neither the black, nor the brown, nor the yellow, nor the red will conquer the white in battle. But if the valuable elements in the Nordic race mix with inferior strains or die out through race suicide, then the citadel of civilization will fall for mere lack of defenders.

Grant claimed that the race which "built" America was in danger of extinction unless the US reined in immigration of Jews and others.

==== Nazi Germany ====
Adolf Hitler wrote to Grant to thank him for writing The Passing of the Great Race, calling it "my Bible". Incorporating Grant's theory, Nazis employed the conspiracy theory widely as propaganda, as exemplified in a 1934 pamphlet written for the "Research Department for the Jewish question" of Walter Frank's "Reich Institute" with the title "Are the white people dying: the future of the white and the colored peoples in the light of biological statistics". Nazis used the conspiracy theory as a call to arms in a bid to gain power through cultural hegemony and scapegoating Jews by leveraging long-running historical prejudices.

Prior to Nazis coming to power, German eugenicists, including Jewish medical and psychiatric professionals, did consider Jews to be distinct from white Europeans, but not so "degenerate" or unfit as to require anything more than guidance avoiding heritable disease via marriage counseling and, as early as 1918, screening for Jews wishing to emigrate to Palestine.

=== Neo-Nazis' accusations against Jews ===
The modern conspiracy theory can be traced back to post-war European neo-Nazi circles, especially René Binet's 1950 book Théorie du Racisme. The latter influenced French 1960s far-right movements such as Europe-Action, which argued that "systematic race mixing [was] nothing more than a slow genocide". In December 1948, Binet's newspaper L'Unité wrote: "We accuse the Zionists and anti-racists of the crime of genocide because they claim to be imposing on us a crossbreeding that would be the death and destruction of our race and civilization".

The term "white genocide" appeared sporadically in the American Nazi Party's White Power newspaper as early as 1972 and was used by the White Aryan Resistance in the 1970s and 1980s, where it primarily referred to contraception and abortion. The conspiracy theory was developed by the neo-Nazi David Lane in his White Genocide Manifesto (c. 1995, origin of the later use of the term), where he made the claim that the government policies of many Western countries had the intent of destroying white European culture and making white people an "extinct species". Lane—a founding member of the organization The Order—criticized miscegenation, abortion, homosexuality, alleged Jewish control of the media, "multi-racial sports", the legal repercussions against those who "resist genocide", and the "Zionist Occupation Government" that he said controls the United States and the other majority-white countries and which encourages "white genocide". Lane coined the "Fourteen words" - "We must secure the existence of our people and a future for white children." - a white genocide slogan. Lane's Fourteen Words were quoted in the Aryan Nations' 1996 Declaration of Independence, which stated that the Zionist Occupation Government sought "the eradication of the white race and its culture" as "one of its foremost purposes". Aryan Nations leader Richard Butler testified in 2000 that "The white race is the most endangered species on the face of the earth." In the 2010s, Aryan Nations and related groups expanded on the "14 Words" with other slogans, such as "Diversity = White Genocide", which have spread to other countries.

Another strand developed in Europe in the 1970s by Austrian neo-Nazi Gerd Honsik, who distorted the early 20th century writings of Richard von Coudenhove-Kalergi with his invention of the Kalergi plan conspiracy theory, which was popularized in a 2005 book.

=== Rhodesian scare tactics ===
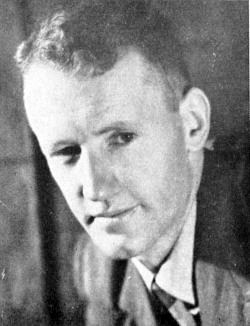
Ian Smith c. 1954

In 1966, Rhodesian Prime Minister Ian Smith was described as having convinced white Rhodesians that their only alternative to his government's Rhodesian Bush War was "dictatorship and white genocide" by communist-backed black nationalist guerrillas.

White supremacists are described as being obsessed with the treatment of the formerly dominant white minorities in Zimbabwe and South Africa by the black majorities where "the diminished stature of whites is presented as an ongoing genocide that must be fought." In particular, the story of Rhodesia, as Zimbabwe was formerly known, ruled by a segregationist government under which most black people were denied the right to vote, holds a particular fascination for white supremacists. Zimbabwe's disastrous economic collapse under the leadership of its second black president, Robert Mugabe, together with the Mugabe government's policies towards the white minority has been cited by white supremacists as evidence of both the inferiority of blacks and a case of genocide against whites. In alt-right and white supremacist groups, there is much nostalgia for Rhodesia, which is seen as a state that fought valiantly for white supremacy in Africa in the 1960–1970s until it was betrayed.

=== Alt-right ===
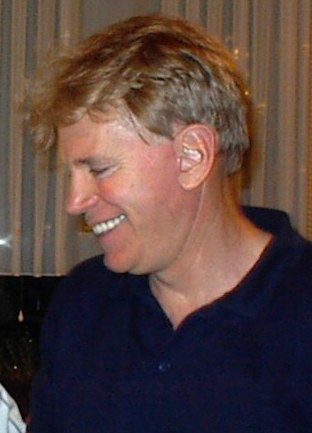
David Duke

In 2008, the conspiracy theory spread beyond its explicit neo-Nazi and white nationalist origins, to be embraced by the newly founded alt-right movement. Discussion threads on the white nationalist Internet forum Stormfront often center around the theme of white people being subjected to genocidal policies by their governments. The concept has also been popularized by the alt-right and alt-lite movements in the United States. The notion of racial purity, homogeneity or "racial hygiene" is an underlying theme of the white genocide discourse and it has been used by people with neo-Nazi and white supremacist backgrounds.

While individual iterations of the conspiracy theory vary on who is assigned blame, Jewish influence, people who hate whites, and liberal political forces are commonly cited by white supremacists as being the main factors leading to a white genocide. This view is held by prominent figures such as David Duke, who cites Jews and "liberal political ideals" as the main causes. White nationalist Robert Whitaker, who coined the phrase "anti-racist is a code word for anti-white" in a widely circulated 2006 piece seeking to popularize the white genocide concept online, used "anti-White" to describe those he believed are responsible for the genocide of white people, and continued to view it as a Jewish conspiracy while emphasizing that others also supported the "anti-White" cause. However, the view that Jews are responsible for a white genocide is contested by other white supremacist figures, such as Jared Taylor.

=== Great Replacement ===
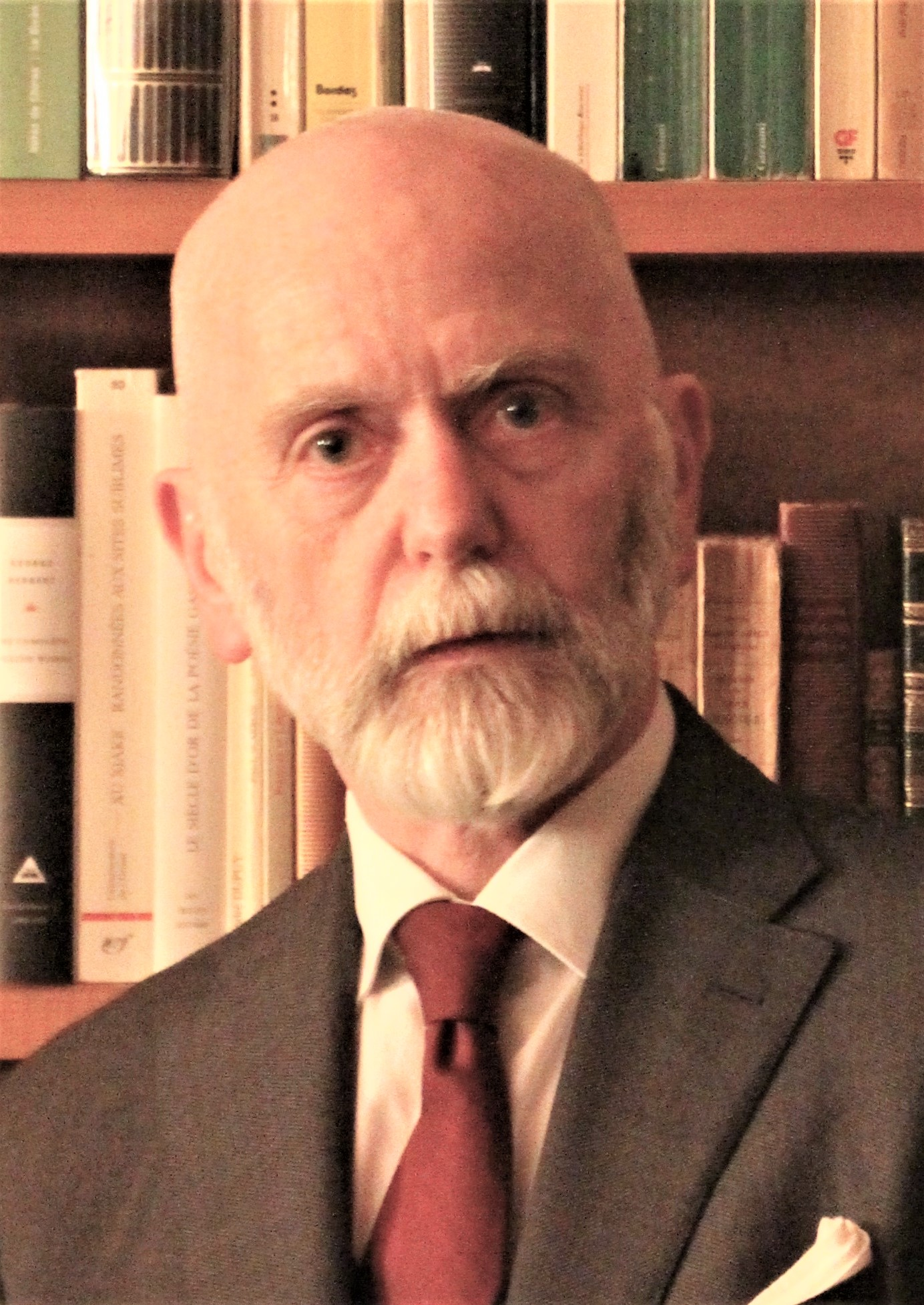
Renaud Camus, progenitor of the Great Replacement theory, March 2019

Starting with French author Renaud Camus and his 2011 book Le Grand Remplacement, the Great Replacement conspiracy theory focused on a displacement of French whites by predominantly Muslim population from the Middle East and Africa, then turned into a pan-European concept which spread across most major countries' politics on the continent. Despite a common reference to a "genocide" of white peoples and a global plan led by a conspiring power, Camus's theory does not include the antisemitic canard of a Jewish plot. His removal of antisemitism from the original neo-Nazi theory (which has been replaced in the European context with Islamophobia), along with his use of simple catch-all slogans, have been cited as reasons for its broader appeal.

The Great Replacement has also been compared with the European Islamophobic strain of Bat Ye'or's 2002 Eurabia conspiracy theory, and with ideas expressed by far-right terrorist Anders Behring Breivik, the perpetrator of the 2011 Norway attacks, in his 2083: A European Declaration of Independence manifesto. Since the 2019 Christchurch mosque shootings, where the shooter named his manifesto The Great Replacement, the French-originated phrase has been widely established as synonymous with "white genocide", used by mainstream Western media interchangeably, and deemed largely responsible for the emerging term of "white replacement".

By 2017, at the Unite the Right rally in Charlottesville, Virginia, white nationalists were referencing the conspiracy theory as tiki torch-wielding protestors, who yelled "You will not replace us!" and "Jews will not replace us!". In response, Camus stated that he did not support Nazis or violence, but that he could understand why white Americans felt angry about being replaced, and that he approved of the sentiment.

== White extinction anxiety ==
"White genocide anxiety", "white displacement anxiety", and the most commonly referred to, "white extinction anxiety" or panic, are said to be a key driving force behind the conspiracy theory and its supporters' adherence to it. The thesis, often cited as an explanation for some sections of white society's resistance to racial diversity, is reported as virtually inseparable from the conspiracy theory itself.

Former diplomat and scholar Alfredo Toro Hardy, who credits journalist Charles M. Blow with the term "white extinction anxiety", has outlined how "the anxieties related to the changing racial landscape of the United States" were at the heart of the concept, and propelled policies such as the Trump administration's "extreme measures against Southern immigrants". In this regard, Trump has been accused of capitalizing on "white genocide anxiety" with claims that immigration had "changed the fabric of Europe", and empowering his supporters in media, such as Laura Ingraham, to stoke fears of "massive demographic changes" within the US. Science journalist Ronald Bailey proposes that Trump is merely "the latest demagogue to rise to power by stoking white folks' ethnic fears", and that "white extinction panics" have historically occurred in the US each time the foreign-born population reached above 13 percent.

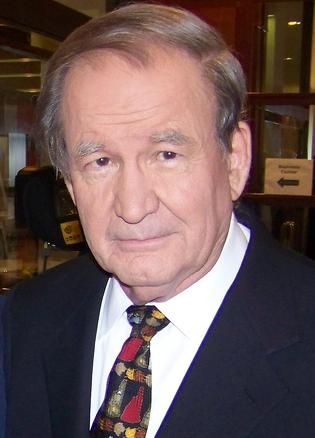
Pat Buchanan in 2008

Blow has defined "white extinction anxiety" as the fear that white people will become a minority, stripped of their race-based privilege. Analyzing the concept, he examined Pat Buchanan's rhetoric (described by Bailey as a form of blood and soil mantra); of whether the nations of Europe and North America had the "will and capacity to halt the invasion of the countries" before immigration altered the "political, social, racial, ethnic – character of the country entirely". Addressing Buchanan's arguably ethnic nationalist conclusions that "You cannot stop these sentiments of people who want to live together with their own and they want their borders protected", Blow said, "Make no mistake here, Buchanan is talking about protecting white dominance, white culture, white majorities and white power".

Anti-racism activist Jane Elliott has suggested that this anxiety, or "Fear of White Genetic Annihilation", is so great that political leaders will resort to any measures in order to prevent the white extinction event that they believe is unfolding, including measures such as the Alabama abortion ban. Anders Behring Breivik's core ideology, and motivations behind his white supremacist attacks, has been described as white extinction anxiety. He had written: "This crisis of mass immigration and sub-replacement fertility is an assault on the European people that, if not combated, will ultimately result in the complete racial and cultural replacement of the European people".

According to professor Alexandra Minna Stern, who has detailed the connection between the conspiracy theory and the anxiety-framed concept, factions of the alt-right are distorting fertility statistics into a "conspiratorial campaign of white extinction" which is being fueled by a looming "white extinction anxiety". She says this phenomenon is driving alt-right strategies such as encouraging couples of Western and Northern European ethnicity to have up to eight children.

== Advocacy and spread ==
The white genocide conspiracy theory has continuously recurred among the far-right in a variety of forms, all centered around a core theme of white populations being replaced, removed, or simply killed.

=== Africa ===
==== South Africa ====
White genocide in South Africa is a conspiracy theory which states that white farmers there are being killed and targeted because they are white, and that the killings are connected to land based policies. The Institute for Security Studies describes the white genocide conspiracy theory as the claim that white South Africans face a genocide, including alleged allegations that attacks on farms and smallholdings are part of a political campaign to force white farmers off their land.

Right wing figures such as Elon Musk, Donald Trump, Tucker Carlson and Steve Hofmeyr have falsely claimed there is a white genocide in South Africa. The South African government, police minister and the United Nations human rights office reject the idea that there is a white genocide in South Africa. The president of Genocide Watch has said the group never claimed a white genocide is underway. The Anti-Defamation League has called such a claim baseless. A 2026 poll found that most South Africans do not agree a white genocide is happening in the country.

The ADL documented that organized activity around the claim of a "genocide of Whites" in South Africa began in 2011, when Monica Stone, described by the ADL as a longtime member of the Louisiana-based white supremacist Christian Defense League and an immigrant from South Africa, originated a protest movement called the "South Africa Project." The ADL stated that in February 2012, this project organized protests at multiple US state capitols, and that the organizers included representatives "from major neo-Nazi, racist skinhead, 'traditional white supremacist,' Christian Identity groups, as well as racist prison gangs." The ADL stated that "since then, white supremacist references to 'genocide' in South Africa have been common."

South African courts and government officials have rejected claims of a "white genocide", citing no evidence that white farmers are systematically targeted for violence. Court rulings, parliamentary discussions, police statistics and Cabinet statements have challenged the claims.

===== Promotion of the narrative =====
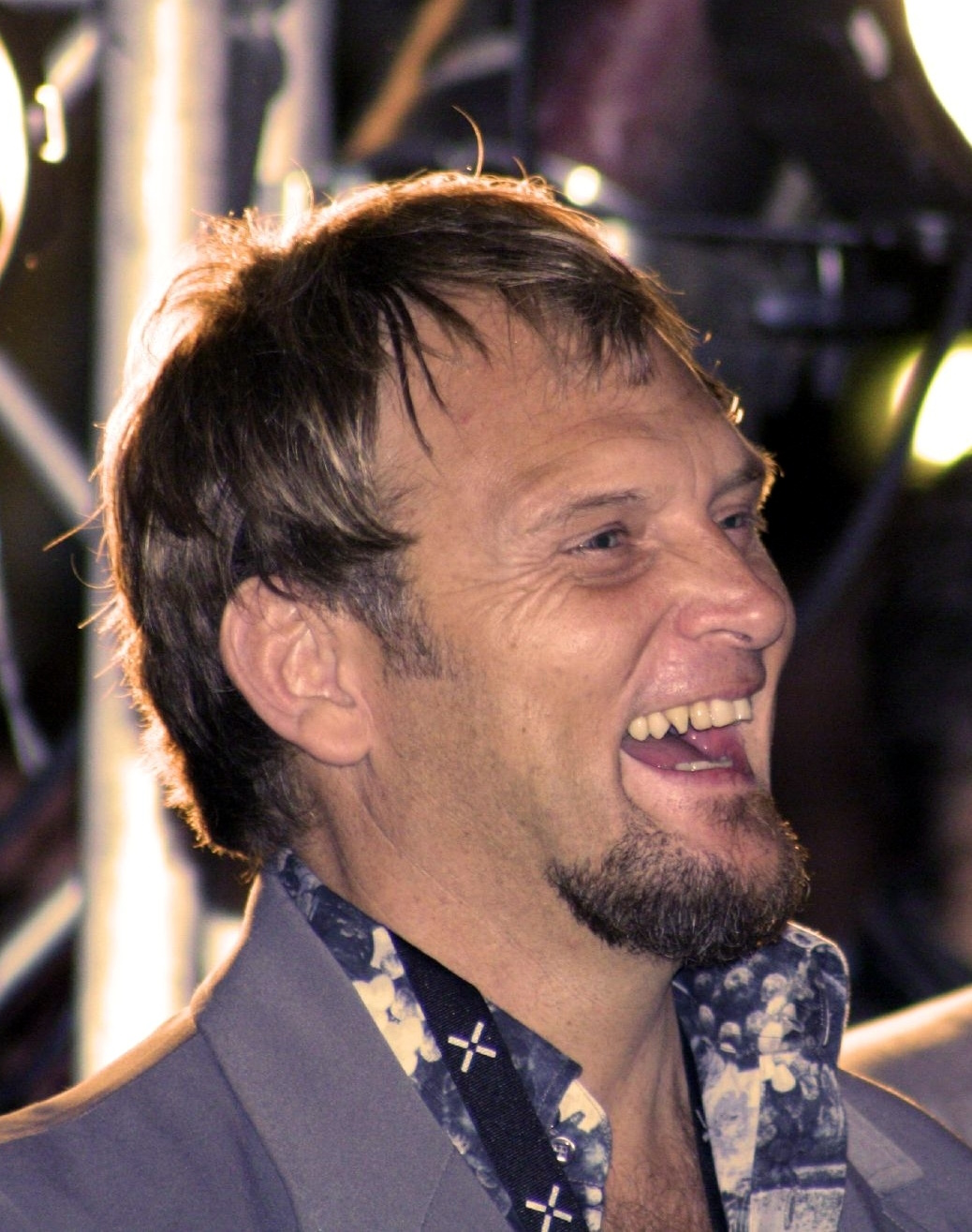
Steve Hofmeyr

The Conversation credits South African singers Steve Hofmeyr and Sunette Bridges with popularising the idea of white genocide through their Red October campaign. It says they advocate that farm murders in South Africa come down to white genocide. Africa Check examined conspiracy theories and claims of a politically motivated "white genocide" in 2013, including claims by Hofmeyr, a popular Afrikaans musician. It reported that he said white South Africans were being killed "like flies," that a white farmer is murdered every five days, and that the number of whites killed by black South Africans would fill a World Cup soccer stadium.

TRT World reports that genocide claims about white South Africans have been picked up and amplified by activists from the West, including Lauren Southern. It says she produced a 2018 documentary called Farmlands that essentially portrays South Africa as a place where an alleged white genocide occurs. The Anti-Defamation League describes Southern as a Canadian alt-right personality and says Farmlands promoted the notion of "genocide against the white population ready to erupt in an all-out race war."

HuffPost reported in June 2019 that Fox News host Tucker Carlson promoted a white nationalist conspiracy theory linking South Africa's post-apartheid land reform plans to an alleged genocide against white farmers. According to HuffPost, he said on his show that skin color was a central motivation. He also described the violence as racist violence as brutal as anything under apartheid. He accused The New York Times of suggesting white farmers deserve to be murdered because the paper did not say whether the recent killing of a white farmer was tied to a land dispute.

The Anti-Defamation League said President Donald Trump's August 2018 tweet closely echoed a longstanding and false white supremacist claim that white farmers in South Africa are targets of racially motivated killings and that "white genocide" was occurring there. In the tweet, Trump said he had asked Secretary of State Mike Pompeo to closely study South Africa's land and farm seizures and expropriations and the "large scale killing of farmers."

NPR's Code Switch said Elon Musk, who is South African, has promoted the white genocide idea on Twitter.

===== High Court ruling in the Boerelegioen estate case =====
A South African high court ruled in February 2025 that a white genocide is not real. It said so while deciding the fate of a $2.1 million donation to a group called Boerelegioen.

The BBC reports that the donor's siblings, who are trustees and beneficiaries of the family trust, took the case to court. They said their brother had become obsessed with an impending genocide of white people in South Africa in the last 10 years of his life. Judge Rosheni Allie wrote that the donor wanted the money to go to an organisation he believed would defend against a white genocide. She called that genocide clearly imagined and not real. The court set the donation aside as invalid, vague and contrary to public policy. Judge Allie also wrote that the donor's belief was fuelled by his racism and the online content he saw.

===== Equality Court and Constitutional Court =====
South Africa's Equality Court and Constitutional Court ruled on the chant "Kill the Boer". Judge Edwin Molahlehi found no evidence that the chant is tied to the murders of white farmers.

Polity reports that Elon Musk accused Julius Malema of openly pushing for the genocide of white people in South Africa because of this chant. AfriForum brought the case against Malema and the EFF. Judge Molahlehi ruled in August 2022 that it was a hate speech case that AfriForum failed to prove.AfriForum argued the song incites violence and fuels farm murders.Molahlehi said the words are not to be taken literally. He found no evidence linking the chanting to the murders of white farmers or of any farmers.Two farm attack survivors who testified for AfriForum gave no link between the song and what happened to them. Molahlehi also said AfriForum failed to show that the lyrics show a clear intention to incite harm. On 27 March 2025, the Constitutional Court refused AfriForum leave to appeal the court said the application bears no reasonable prospects of success.

===== Parliament's Police and Agriculture committees =====
Parliament's portfolio committees on police and agriculture met on 19 March 2025 and discussed whether white genocide is happening. Members and the Police Minister said the figures do not show farmers being targeted.

Daily Maverick reports that a South African Police Service presentation showed 12 murders linked to farming communities between October and December 2024. One of the dead was a farmer. The other victims were four farm employees, five people staying on farms and one security officer. Makashule Gana of Rise Mzansi told the meeting there is no targeting or mass killing of farmers. He said there is no deliberate organised killing of farmers and that the statistics do not support it. He wanted both committees to tell the public so. Fadiel Adams of the National Coloured Congress asked whether the committees could put out a statement that there is no such thing as a white genocide. Agriculture committee chair Dina Pule said she was hesitant to issue a statement, because it could fuel certain narratives. She said crime touches everyone. Police committee chair Ian Cameron said the cruelty of farm attacks cuts across racial lines. Police Minister Senzo Mchunu told the meeting that those concerned about genocide of white farmers should rely on scientific evidence.

===== Police Minister Senzo Mchunu =====
Police Minister Senzo Mchunu has said there is no white genocide in South Africa. He gave police figures on farm murders when he released the crime statistics on 23 May 2025.

AFP reports that Mchunu called the genocide conspiracy totally unfounded and totally unsubstantiated. He said police do not normally split crime figures by race, but he did so for farm murders because of the claims of genocide of white people. SAnews, the government news agency, reports that he said farm murders have always included African people in more numbers. He said the two farm owners murdered between January and March 2025 were African, as were two farm employees and a farm manager. One farm dweller was white. AFP reports that he also rejected the claim that the government is expropriating land held by white farmers. In a written reply to a parliamentary question on 6 June 2025, the Minister of Police called the idea of a white genocide a recurring international claim. The reply said official data and academic research do not support the idea that white farmers are targeted in a systematic or racially motivated campaign.

===== Cabinet =====
South Africa's Cabinet has said there is no genocide in the country. Minister in the Presidency Khumbudzo Ntshavheni delivered the Cabinet's position at post-Cabinet briefings.

On 15 May 2025, Ntshavheni said Cabinet emphasises that there is no genocide in South Africa. She said police statistics on farm crimes do not support claims of widespread violence or genocide targeted at farmers or any racial group. SAnews reports that she also said allegations of discrimination against Afrikaners are unfounded and fall short of the persecution required under refugee law. On 30 July 2026, she said Cabinet had noted reports that white South Africans who resettled in the United States under the falsehood of a white genocide had been denied visas. She said those who return are welcome. Business Day reports that in court papers answering a defamation suit by Solidarity, Ntshavheni said the claim that white Afrikaner farmers suffer disproportionately from murder, robbery and rape is not true. The suit is over a Cabinet statement that Solidarity says accused it of spreading misinformation about white genocide.

===== Human rights groups and other organizations =====
Human rights organizations and research groups have rejected claims of a white genocide in South Africa based on a lack of evidence. The United Nations Human Rights Office has criticized the use of the term genocide, while groups including the Anti-Defamation League, Genocide Watch and Southern Poverty Law Center have challenged the claims and their use by white supremacists.

===== Anti-Defamation League =====
The Anti-Defamation League has said claims of white genocide in South Africa are baseless. On 9 August 2023, the ADL issued a statement signed by its CEO, Jonathan Greenblatt, on the song "Kill the Boer." Greenblatt wrote that the song's lyrics could be interpreted as a call for violence. He also wrote that baseless claims of "white genocide" have been made by right-wing extremists in the US, particularly white supremacists, for years. He said such charges have been used to excuse hate, justify harassment and rationalize violence.

In a statement on 23 August 2018, the ADL called President Trump's tweet about South Africa's white farmers a false white supremacist claim. The ADL said its Center on Extremism documented a 2012 white supremacist effort called the "South Africa Project," which aimed to stop an alleged genocide of whites in South Africa. It said white supremacist references to genocide in South Africa have been common since.

===== United Nations Human Rights Office =====
A spokesperson of the United nations Human rights office in Geneva on 23 May 2025, said that calling what is happening to white South Africans a genocide is wholly inappropriate.

AFP reports that spokesperson Ravina Shamdasani said the word genocide should not be used casually without deep knowledge of what it means. She said looking at the history of South Africa, it is wholly inappropriate. Africa Check reported in an analysis of Genocide Watch that the United Nations has not placed South Africa on a genocide watch list.

===== Genocide Watch =====
Genocide Watch lists South Africa at stage six of its stages of genocide. Its president, Gregory Stanton, says the group has never said a white genocide is underway.

Africa Check reports that Stanton told it, Genocide Watch has never said white genocide is underway in South Africa. He called the claim that South Africa is undergoing a white genocide a false use of the group's model. He said it is made by some South Africans, racists in the United States and a few South African expatriates. Africa Check reports that Stanton said the group's qualitative indicators for South Africa came from news reports and direct reports from people of all races and groups. Polity published a warning from Stanton in December 2014. He said early warnings of genocide run deep in South African society, though genocide has not begun.

===== Southern Poverty Law Center =====
The Southern Poverty Law Center says the white genocide claim about South Africa is a white nationalist narrative. It published its analysis in August 2018.

The SPLC wrote that President Trump's tweet on South Africa signified the mainstreaming of white nationalist narratives about white genocide, of which farm murders are an essential component. It defines genocide as an organized, systematic attempt at extermination by a government or non-state actors. It wrote that all efforts to prove that the ANC government is complicit in mass killings fall flat. The SPLC also wrote that white nationalists have used South Africa's ranking in Genocide Watch's system to argue that genocide is imminent or underway. It wrote that Genocide Watch's director, Gregory Stanton, has explicitly denied this.

===== Institute for Security Studies =====
The Institute for Security Studies, a research group based in Pretoria, says there is no white genocide in South Africa.

Newham wrote that there is no "white genocide" in South Africa. He wrote that two independent inquiries into farm attacks, one under police minister Steve Tshwete and one by the South African Human Rights Commission, examined claims of a political campaign to force white farmers off their land. He wrote that neither inquiry found evidence for it. He wrote that the motive for farm murders is almost always robbery and not an intent to destroy an ethnic group. He wrote that whether genocide has been committed is a matter of international law under the 1948 Genocide Convention and the 1998 Rome Statute. If the Trump administration believes genocide is happening, Newham wrote, legal avenues exist and none have been pursued. PolitiFact quotes Newham saying that if there were any evidence of genocide or targeted violence against any group because of ethnicity, the institute would be among the first to raise the alarm.

===== Public opinion =====
A March 2026 poll found that a large majority of South Africans rejected claims of white genocide, including half of white respondents. Interviews with Afrikaner farmers and other South Africans have shown some fears of alleged violence and many rejecting the genocide claims.

===== Institute of Race Relations poll, March 2026 =====
The Institute of Race Relations polled South Africans on whether a white genocide is taking place.

The Institute of Race Relations says it polled 1,038 registered voters between 9 and 20 March 2026, with a margin of error of about three percentage points. The Institute reports that 72% of South Africans disagreed that a white genocide is taking place, and only 19% agreed. The Common Sense reported the results by race, based on respondents' view of Trump's claim that a white genocide is happening. Overall, 71% disagreed and 20% agreed, and the rest were unsure or would not say. Among white respondents, 50% disagreed and 37% agreed. Among Black respondents, 74% disagreed and 17% agreed. Among coloured respondents, 82% disagreed, 11% agreed and 7% were unsure or would not say. Among Indian respondents, 58% disagreed and 32% agreed. The report's author, Hermann Pretorius, said the overwhelming majority of citizens, including most whites, do not accept the language of white genocide as an accurate description of their society.

===== Nampo agricultural fair =====
Afrikaner farmers at South Africa's biggest agricultural fair were split on whether a white genocide is happening. Agence France-Presse spoke to them in May 2025, days after the first Afrikaner refugees left for the United States.

AFP reports that maize farmer John Potgieter, 31, said there is no doubt there is a genocide in South Africa. He pointed to a monument listing the names of farmers killed in attacks since the 1960s and said the white Afrikaner minority is a target. He added that genocide is a broad word and not a mass genocide like the Holocaust. Sheep and goat farmer Eduard van der Westhuizen told AFP that it is much safer on a farm than in a town. He said there are problems and sometimes murders, but they are not targeted. A farm equipment dealer called Trump's invitation to resettle a farce. Danny Snyman, 18, said Trump had raised awareness about the issues, though he had never heard of any murders, only a lot of stealing. The Associated Press reported from the same fair that even some conservative white Afrikaner groups denied the genocide claims.

===== CBS News interviews, May 2025 =====
CBS News interviewed Afrikaners in May 2025 about a white genocide in South Africa.

CBS News reported that Dolf Grobler, who applied for resettlement in the United States, said he is worried that unproven genocide, which is mainly focused on white farmers, was going to spread. Piet Croucamp of North-West University told CBS News there is no sign of a white genocide and never has been. He said whites are economically the strongest group in South Africa. Cattle farmer Nick Serfontein told CBS News that a white genocide is not happening. He said he feels safe and sleeps with his doors open on the farm. CBS News also reports that claims of a white genocide are often circulated by right-wing groups, but the view is not held widely within the Afrikaner community.

===== 60 Minutes interviews =====
CBS News's 60 Minutes interviewed farmers and others in South Africa about President Trump's claim of a genocide of white farmers. It aired in February 2026.

CBS News reports that Rene Nel, whose husband Tollie was murdered on their farm in 2024, said Trump's use of the word genocide does not fit what she knows or has seen. She views the killing as a crime of opportunity by people who knew there was money and firearms on the farm. Johan Kotze, the head of South Africa's largest agricultural organisation, travelled to Washington to explain the situation to administration officials. He told CBS News he was shocked when they asked him about white genocide. He said he is as Afrikaans as one can get and never witnessed that. Max du Preez, an Afrikaans journalist, told CBS News there are no large-scale killings of farmers. He said Trump was fed the link between farm murders and genocide, and that there is no such thing.

===== Conspiracy theories =====
Elon Musk has argued on X that a genocide of white people is being pushed in South Africa. In July 2023, Musk wrote on X that Julius Malema was openly pushing for the genocide of white people in South Africa. Polity reports that Musk was reacting to Malema chanting "Kill the Boer" at the Economic Freedom Fighters' tenth anniversary rally at FNB Stadium. Musk tagged President Cyril Ramaphosa and asked why he said nothing. NBC News reports that Musk has accused the Ramaphosa government of doing too little to stop what he calls a genocide against white farmers.

In March 2025, Musk replied to a video of a Malema rally and wrote that a major political party in South Africa is actively promoting white genocide. He added that a whole arena was chanting about killing white people. IOL reports that in the same period Musk said South Africa had passed a law that lets property be taken from white people at will with no payment. He also said Starlink cannot get a license in South Africa because he is not Black.

President Donald Trump has claimed genocide is taking place against white farmers in South Africa. PBS NewsHour reports that on 12 May 2025 a reporter asked Trump why he created a faster path to the United States for Afrikaners. Trump answered that they are being killed and that a genocide is taking place that the press does not want to write about. He added that white farmers are being brutally killed and their land is being confiscated. FactCheck.org reports that Trump also said the newspapers and television media do not talk about it.

On 21 May 2025, Trump played a video in the Oval Office for President Cyril Ramaphosa. Axios reports that he said the video showed burial sites of over a thousand white farmers. It reports that Trump said the video showed dead white farmers, mostly. On 7 November 2025, Trump wrote on Truth Social that Afrikaners are being killed and slaughtered and their land and farms are being illegally confiscated. Al Jazeera reports that he said no US official would attend the G20 summit in South Africa while these human rights abuses continue.

On his 30 September 2026 show, Tucker Carlson claiimed hundreds of white South Africans have been killed, and he called this documented. Media Matters reports that he said every one of them was killed by a Black South African, and it is racially motivated. He said the testimony of almost every survivor supports this. He asked why the Anti-Defamation League would attack survivors and their families. He also rejected Wikipedia's description of white genocide as a conspiracy theory. He said the white share of the population in the United States and Europe has fallen over decades and called those facts.

Briefly reports that the episode was titled "The Most Sickening Story the Media Says Doesn't Exist: South Africa's White Genocide." Briefly says Carlson used the account of a 2010 farm attack, told by guest Leon Lotz, to argue that international media deliberately suppress or dismiss what he called the ethnic cleansing of white South Africans. Al Jazeera reports in an opinion piece that on 3 March 2025 Carlson opened an interview with Ernst Roets by saying South Africa appears to be collapsing and its government is essentially genocidally racist.

The Spectator reported in December 2023 that Steve Hofmeyr thinks genocide is the right word. He said that anyone who thinks the killing of farmers is not enough to call it genocide should ask those farmers about their land, language, religion, education, universities, heritage, monuments, safety and dignity. He added the race-based rules placed on them and their children to that list.

IOL reports that Pieter Groenewald, then chairman of the Freedom Front Plus, said farm murders can justifiably be viewed as genocide when measured against international norms. He said the United Nations Human Rights Commission should force the ANC government to take urgent steps to stop them. IOL reports that his party planned to submit two motions on this to the Unrepresented Nations and Peoples Organisation in Brussels. It reports that the party's earlier leader, Pieter Mulder, had told the United Nations in Geneva at the end of 2014 about farm murders, Afrikaans, affirmative action and other abuses against minorities.

===== Anders Behring Breivik =====
The manifesto of far-right terrorist Anders Behring Breivik, entitled 2083: A European Declaration of Independence, devotes an entire section to an alleged "genocide" against Afrikaners. It also contains several other references to alleged persecution of whites in South Africa and the attacks on white farmers. Mike Cernovich, an American alt-right commentator, has previously stated that "white genocide in South Africa is real". The survivalist group the Suidlanders has claimed credit for internationally publicizing the risks of a race war and ethnic cleansing against whites.

Africa Check, a fact-checking organisation, rejected these claims as false in 2013: "In fact, whites are less likely to be murdered than any other race group." Africa Check reported that while whites account for nearly 9% of the South African population they represent just 1.8% of murder victims. Lizette Lancaster from the Institute for Security Studies has said that "Whites are far less likely to be murdered than their black or coloured counterparts." British journalist Joe Walsh reported that the murder rates in the mainly white suburbs of Johannesburg were far lower than in the black townships of Johannesburg, leading him to conclude: "If there was any kind of genocide being carried out against white people in the country then the safest areas of the continent's most dangerous city would not be predominately white."

South African journalist Lynsey Chutel reported in 2018: "After a peak in 2001/2002, the number of farm attacks—rape, robbery and other forms of violent crime short of murder—has decreased to about half. Similarly, the number of murders on farms peaked in 1997/1998 at 153, but today that number is below 50." Chutel stated that although some of the murders of white farmers may indeed be racially motivated, South Africa is a country with a high violent crime rate and white farmers are "isolated and believed to be wealthy". In the period July 2017 to July 2018, 47 farmers of all races were killed in South Africa, down from 66 murdered between July 2016 and July 2017. The worst year for farm murders in South Africa was 1998, when 153 farmers were killed. Between April 2016 and March 2017, there were a total of 19,016 murders in South Africa, suggesting that farmers are not especially likely to be killed in South Africa. Gregory Stanton of Genocide Watch has condemned the misuse of his groups' reports of the threat of polarization in South Africa to further the idea of "white genocide".

Even mainstream American conservatives who often championed the causes of Rhodesia and apartheid South Africa, seeing both regimes as having supposedly more enlightened policies towards black people than the policy of integration in the United States, embraced the variants of the white genocide theory as part of the defense of Rhodesia and South Africa. In 2015, the Canadian journalist Jeet Heer wrote: "The idea that whites in America have a natural affinity with white colonialists in Africa did not spring from the neo-Nazi far-right, but rather the conservative movement that coalesced around National Review in the 1950s." In the July 1988 edition of Commentary, David Roberts, Jr., compared Nelson Mandela to Pol Pot and the African National Congress (ANC), the now ruling party in South Africa, to the Khmer Rouge, implying that the ANC would exterminate South African whites if it came to power. Shortly before his death in 2005 Samuel T. Francis, the former editor of the conservative Washington Times, warned about the possibility of a "white genocide" in South Africa.

Simon Roche, an Afrikaner nationalist from South Africa and a spokesman for the survivalist group, the Suidlanders, that exists, in his words, "to prepare a Protestant Christian South African Minority for a coming violent revolution", visited the US in 2017 to promote the thesis that the white minority in South Africa is faced with the threat of ethnic cleansing. Roche stated he went to the US to "raise awareness of and support for the Caucasian Christian conservative volk [people] of South Africa ... There's a natural affinity with conservative white Americans."

The Afrikaner group AfriForum's deputy director Ernst Roets has been erroneously linked by Radio 702, which it later apologised for, to false claims of white genocide, and South African government authorization of uncompensated seizures of land from white farmers. Roets' 2018 book Kill the Boer argues that the government is also complicit in attacks on white farmers, and characterizes the events as ethnic cleansing. Another South African, Willem Petzer, appeared as a guest on Gavin McInnes's podcast, accusing the ANC government of planning genocide.

=== Europe ===
==== Finland ====
In a survey conducted by Iltalehti, one-third of the voters of the far-right Finns Party, the second biggest party in parliament, thought that "the European race must be prevented from mixing with darker races, otherwise the European native population will eventually become extinct". Finns Party Minister of the Interior Mari Rantanen wrote that if Finns remain naive on immigration, Finns "will not remain blue-eyed" and shared writings referring to refugees as "parasites". Toni Jalonen, at the time deputy-chair of the Finns Party Youth, posted a picture of a black family with the text "Vote for the Finns, so that Finland's future doesn't look like this".

While the Finns Party have brought the white genocide rhetoric into the parliament, it entered politics before them. For example, in the 1990s, Oulu city councillor and former leader of Nordic Realm Party-aligned Patriotic Finnish Youth Jouni Lanamäki gained attention with statements that he aims to keep Oulu "a white Nordic city" and the survival of Finns requires "combatting the colored peoples".

==== France ====
Figures on the right of French politics, such as Renaud Camus, have claimed that a "white genocide" or "Great Replacement" is occurring in France. Camus's definition, which focuses largely on the white Christian population in France, has been used in media interchangeably with white genocide, and described as a narrower, less extreme and more nationally focused version of the broader conspiracy theory. Despite his focus on the specific demographics of France, Camus also believes all Western countries are facing a form of "ethnic and civilizational substitution".

In June 2017, Senator Stéphane Ravier's aide, running as one of the National Front's candidates, endorsed the conspiracy theory. Publishing a blonde girl's photograph with the words "Say no to white genocide" days before the 2017 French legislative election, Ravier's assistant gave a political ultimatum "the National Front or the invasion".

==== Germany ====
The 2015 New Year's Eve attacks in Cologne resulted in accusations that the federal government and media were deliberately avoiding public interest reporting on 1,200 sexual assaults by thousands of young male Muslim immigrants. Apologies for hesitancy by public television channel ZDF strengthened claims of a Lügenpresse (lying press) by populist and far-right parties as evidence for widespread conspiracy by German institutions. The unprecedented scale of border crossings during 2015 and 2016 compelled Chancellor Angela Merkel to impose "temporary restrictions" on transit across the border with Austria. The alt-right conspiracy website Zero Hedge listed statistics on migrant crime in Germany alongside statements from politicians and news articles, presented as "contradictions confirming a deep-state level of conspiracy ... to push through a pro-immigration policy in Germany". During the 2017 German election campaign, the far-right Alternative for Germany party ran advertisements featuring a pregnant woman's abdomen with the slogan, "New Germans? We'll make them ourselves". Events like the 2015 New Year's Eve sexual assaults, and the great replacement conspiracy theory also further radicalized right-wing extremist Stephan Ernst, who in response assassinated the local politician Walter Lübcke in 2019. Based on protocols of his first confession, Ernst held Lübcke responsible for letting non-white refugees into the country.

==== Hungary ====
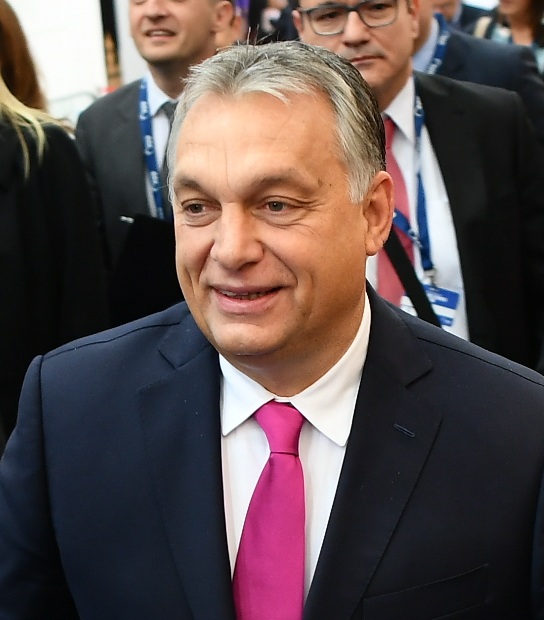
Viktor Orbán

A state-sponsored campaign led by Hungarian Prime Minister Viktor Orbán has employed a wide range of historical antisemitic tropes to accuse philanthropist George Soros of engaging in conspiracies to support and deceive the public about nonwhite immigrants. Orbán has accused Soros, a Jew whose family survived hostile conditions during Hungary's Nazi occupation, of being a Nazi himself, and has introduced legislation known as the "Stop Soros law" to criminalize organized support of immigrants. These fabrications have become popular with the alt-right in Europe and the US. Orbán's 2018 campaign slogan was "Christianity is Europe's last hope", saying, "our worst nightmares can come true. The West falls as it fails to see Europe being overrun."

==== Poland ====
Hundreds of Polish Facebook groups such as "Stop White Genocide" have produced and disseminated images depicting African and Middle eastern people as belonging to separate "primitive" species, lacking the human intelligence of white Europeans. Websites such as "Conspiracy Files" have fabricated allegations of political compacts to bolster nonwhite immigration against popular will, such as agreements signed by EU leaders and African nations to increase Europe's African population to 300 million by 2068, making native whites, "minorities within their own homeland".

==== Russia ====
Much of the theory that South African whites are faced with the threat of "genocide" originates with internet rumors started by the Government of Russia. Russia-24, a television channel owned by the Russian government, aired a segment in the summer of 2018 about Afrikaner farmers wanting to immigrate to Russia as "brothers in faith". The present government in Russia led by Vladimir Putin often attacks the ideology of liberalism for putting the individual before the collective, and promotes "white genocide" stories both as a way of showing the failure of liberalism and to promote the thesis that group identities matter far more than individual identities. The ideology of the Russian state is that the interests of the collective take precedence over the individual, and evidence of alleged failures of liberalism abroad are extensively covered by the Russian media. The Australian historian Mark Edele stated: "There is definitely an attempt [by Russia] to support alt-right views and extreme right organisations outside of Russia ... Russia supports groups that will undermine liberal views. That's the logic of sponsorship of alt-right groups by Russia ... There is a longstanding anxiety among Russia's nationalists that Russians are dying out because of falling birth rates compared to non-Slavic peoples. It reverberates with white genocide fears."

The Canadian alt-right personality Lauren Southern had a sympathetic interview with the Russian fascist thinker Aleksandr Dugin, who told her "liberalism denies the existence of any collective identities" and that "liberalism is based on the absence of any form of collective identity". Dugin used the case of white South African farmers allegedly threatened with genocide as proof of the failure of liberalism, for putting the individual ahead of the collective. After the end of apartheid in 1994, South Africa was presented as the "rainbow nation" where henceforward people, regardless of their skin color, would be judged only as individuals. From the viewpoint of the Russian state, presenting liberalism in South Africa as a blood-soaked disaster is a way of discrediting liberalism in general.

==== Sweden ====
The 2017 Swedish neo-Nazi propaganda film Europa: The Last Battle claims that Jews are conspiring to engineer the downfall of the white race by encouraging immigration and interracial relationships.

==== United Kingdom ====
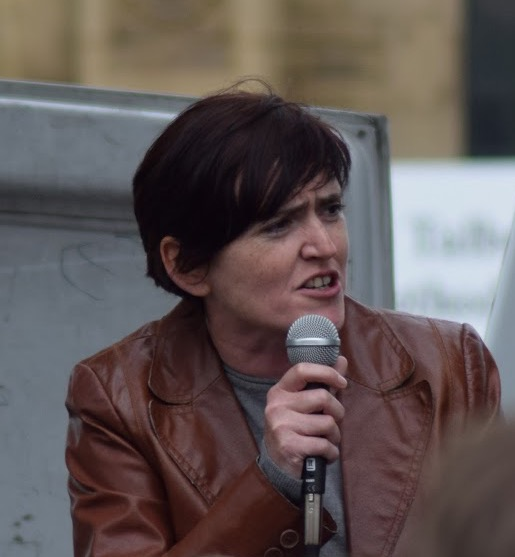
Anne Marie Waters

In a 2015 Breitbart News article, the anti-Islamic For Britain party founder and leader Anne Marie Waters described white genocide as "part of a broad-ranging, virulent, and vicious hatred of white Western people" and claimed that European leaders aimed to "extinguish Western culture".

In December 2015, former EDL leader Tommy Robinson endorsed the white genocide myth. In his 2015 book Enemy of the State, Robinson claimed how previously white British majority areas of his hometown, Luton, had suffered "ethnic cleansing" and claimed that the United Kingdom was "sleepwalking" its "way towards a Muslim takeover".

A few weeks before the 2016 Brexit referendum, an unemployed gardener with links to far-right organisations murdered Member of Parliament Jo Cox because of her support of the European Union and work in support of immigrants, saying she was part of a left-wing conspiracy perpetuated by the mainstream media and a traitor to the white race. A March 2016 survey ahead of the referendum found 41% of Britons thought their government was concealing the true number of immigrants.

Katie Hopkins, an English media personality, made a documentary supporting the conspiracy theory of an ongoing white genocide against farmers in South Africa. In March 2018, British journalist Rod Liddle was identified as promoting the conspiracy theory in an article in The Spectator, according to Vice website. He suggested Lauren Southern, who had made her own documentary about South Africa, would have been greeted positively had it been about "any other brand of genocide".

Katie Hopkins has also promoted the idea that both immigration and multiculturalism are intended to cause white genocide. Yahoo! News reported that while traveling for the documentary, "her intention was to 'expose' the white genocide" happening to farmers in South Africa.

In September 2018, with the arrest of some Neo-Nazi members of National Action, the counter-terrorist Prevent programme identified the white supremacist group as subscribing to the white extinction conspiracy theory. A governmental co-ordinator stated that the organization "sees the extinction of white people as a very real and likely possibility".

In March 2019, Catherine Blaiklock resigned as leader of the Brexit Party after she shared a photo on social media of a multi-racial primary school in England with the caption "This is a British school. This is white genocide". Another shared post of Blaiklock's claimed that multiculturalism amounted to "the replacement of the indigenous European people". In April 2019, a Conservative Party candidate for local elections was revealed to have promoted the conspiracy theory after endorsing online material which claimed that the "destruction of the white race" was being brought about by non-white immigrants who were "flooding" Europe "disguised as so-called 'refugees'" in an alleged plot to "enforce miscegenation" on white Europeans. He was subsequently suspended from his party but remained on the ballot for the election.

The identitarian movement Generation Identity party leader and neo-Nazi Mark Collett has been actively promoting the conspiracy theory on Twitter and YouTube.

=== United States ===
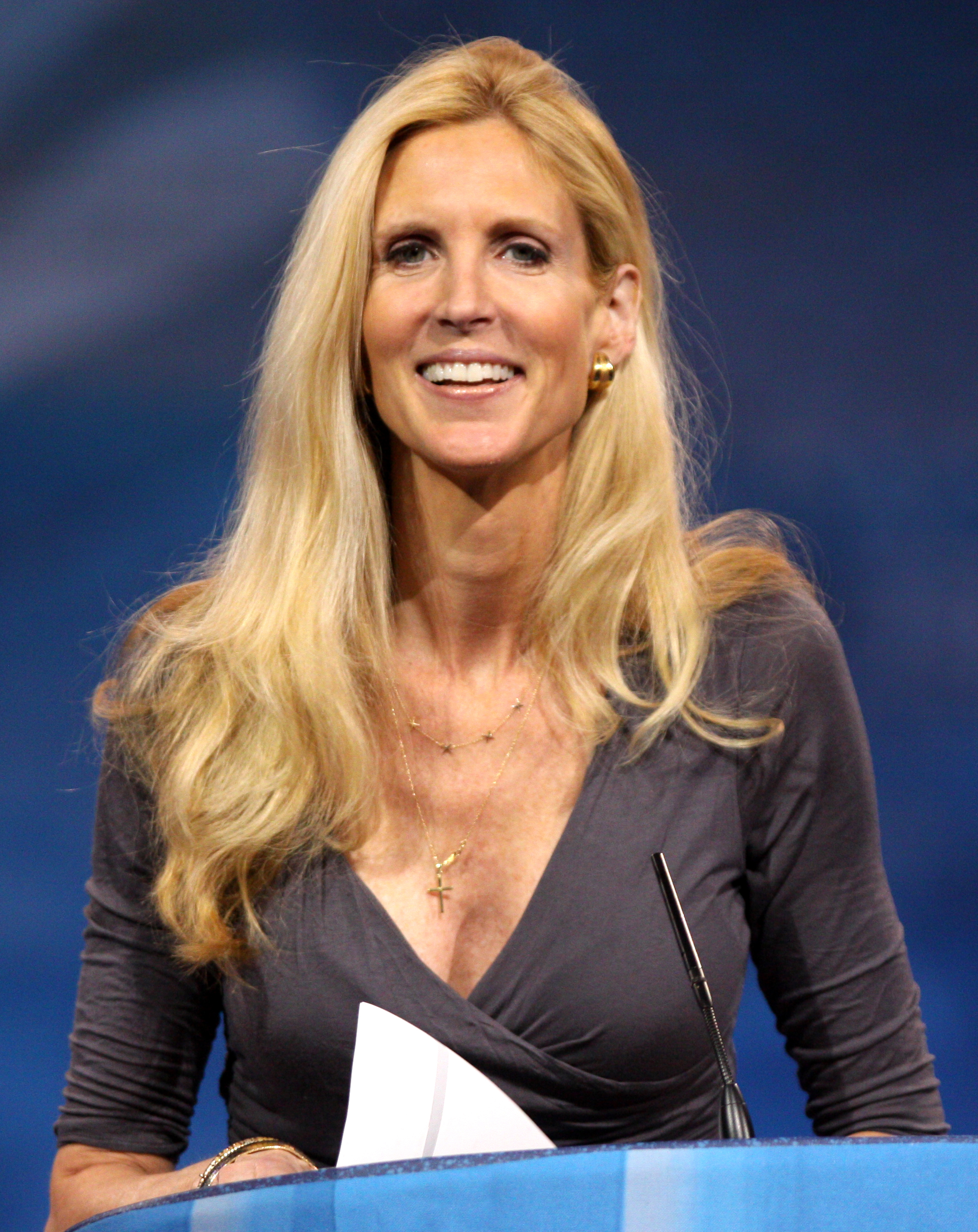
Ann Coulter at the 2013 Conservative Political Action Conference

According to Erika Lee, in 1894 the old stock Yankee upper-class founders of the Immigration Restriction League were "convinced that Anglo-Saxon traditions, peoples, and culture were being drowned in a flood of racially inferior foreigners from Southern and Eastern Europe."

In 2007, conservative Ann Coulter described non-white immigration to the United States as "white genocide" in her article titled "Bush's America: Roach Motel". Vox has reported on Coulter as one of many providing a platform for "the 'white genocide' myth". She has been described as a "champion" of the ideas behind the conspiracy theory following a book she wrote on the subject. She has also claimed that "a genocide" is occurring against white South African farmers.

In October 2014, white nationalist Greg Johnson promoted the white extinction conspiracy theory, suggesting that "the organized Jewish community is the principal enemy—not the sole enemy, but the principal enemy—of every attempt to halt and reverse white extinction. One cannot defeat an enemy one will not name. Therefore, White Nationalism is inescapably anti-Semitic."

In December 2014, Ku Klux Klan leader Thomas Robb proposed that white genocide was occurring due to the immigration and high birth-rates of non-whites. He claimed that demographic change was affecting the economic, racial and social landscape of Harrison, Arkansas, and the US at large, and that this amounted to "white genocide being committed against our people". Around that time, the concept appeared on billboards in the United States near Birmingham, Alabama, and Harrison, Arkansas.

==== 2016 US presidential election campaigns ====
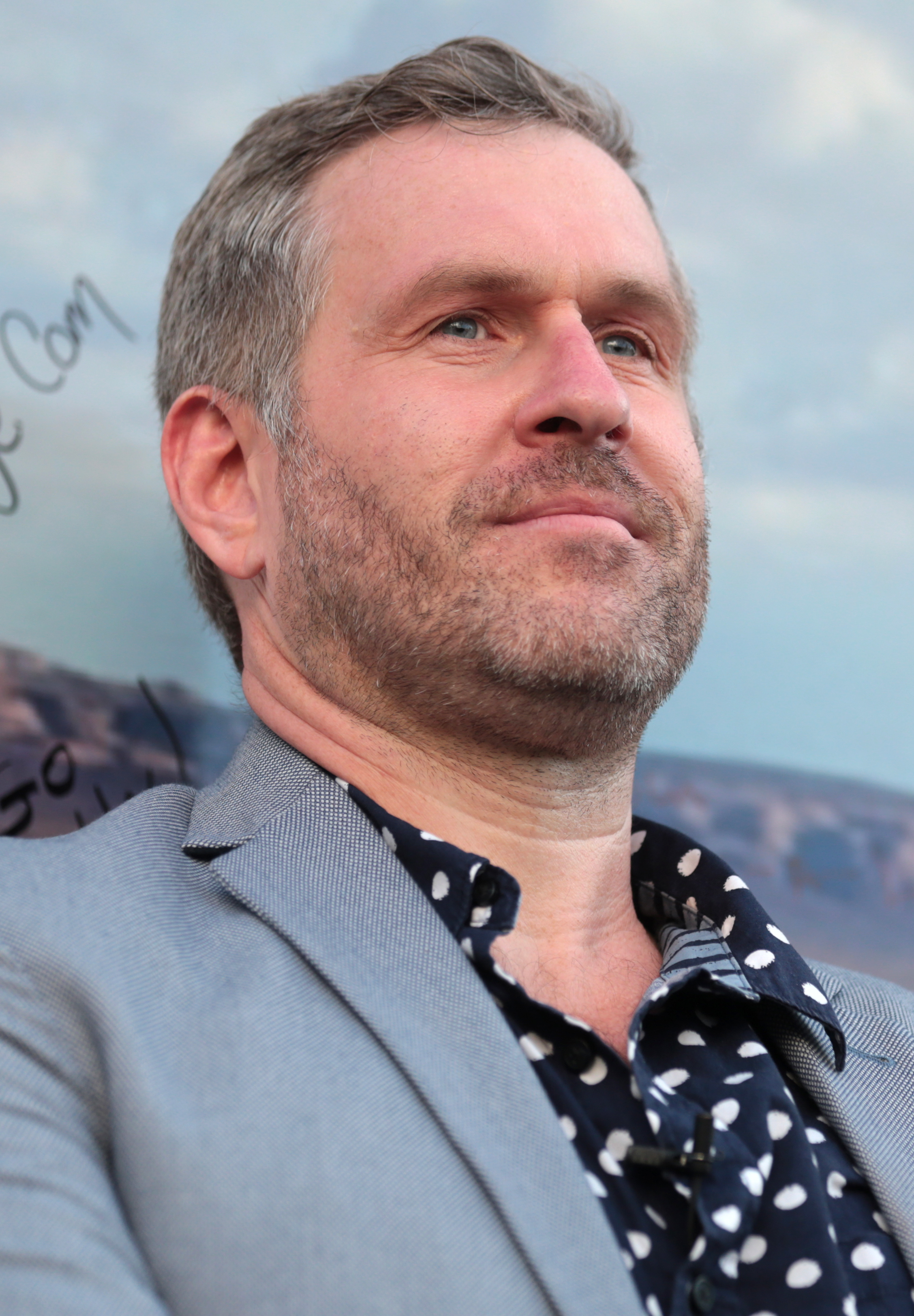
Mike Cernovich in August 2018

In October 2015, Mike Cernovich, a social media personality, published the white nationalist catchphrase "diversity is code for white genocide", claiming that his discovery of the concept had caused him to cease being a libertarian and instead become an alt-right activist. Days later, he invoked the conspiracy theory again, warning that "white genocide will sweep up the SJWs", a prediction that Muslims would murder what he labelled social justice warriors in the United States. In November 2015, Cernovich insisted that "white genocide is real" in relation to South Africa. After a public backlash, he deleted several tweets referring to the conspiracy theory.

During the 2016 US presidential election, there were allegations that aspects of the conspiracy theory had been adopted as dog-whistling by some mainstream conservative political figures. In January 2016, Donald Trump garnered controversy after retweeting Twitter user @WhiteGenocideTM, and @EustaceFash, whose Twitter header image at the time also included the term "white genocide". A 2016 analysis of his Twitter feed during the Republican presidential primaries showed that 62% of those that he chose to retweet in an average week followed multiple accounts which discussed the conspiracy theory, and 21% followed prominent white nationalists online.

By March 2016, Trump's eldest son, Donald Trump Jr., had been accused by mainstream media of being an advocate of the conspiracy theory, or pretending to be an advocate for political gain, after his interview with white supremacist James Edwards during the 2016 Trump presidential campaign. The following month, Jack Posobiec, a leading alt-right Trump activist and, at the time, US naval intelligence officer with military security clearance, began frequently tweeting about white genocide.

While Donald Trump supporters on the Reddit discussion forum r/The_Donald generally agreed that white genocide is occurring, they disagreed about the responsible parties. The Southern Poverty Law Center said "Tea Party conservatives characterize it as a scheme by Democrats to gain voters. For the white nationalists, the main villain is 'international Jewry.' InfoWars fans blame 'globalists'—a label that is often interchangeable with 'Jews'—seeking to dumb down Western populations with 'low-IQ migrants' who are more easily controlled." In August 2017, at least 330 r/The_Donald posts referred to the "Kalergi plan", a purported conspiracy to replace the European population with African migrants.

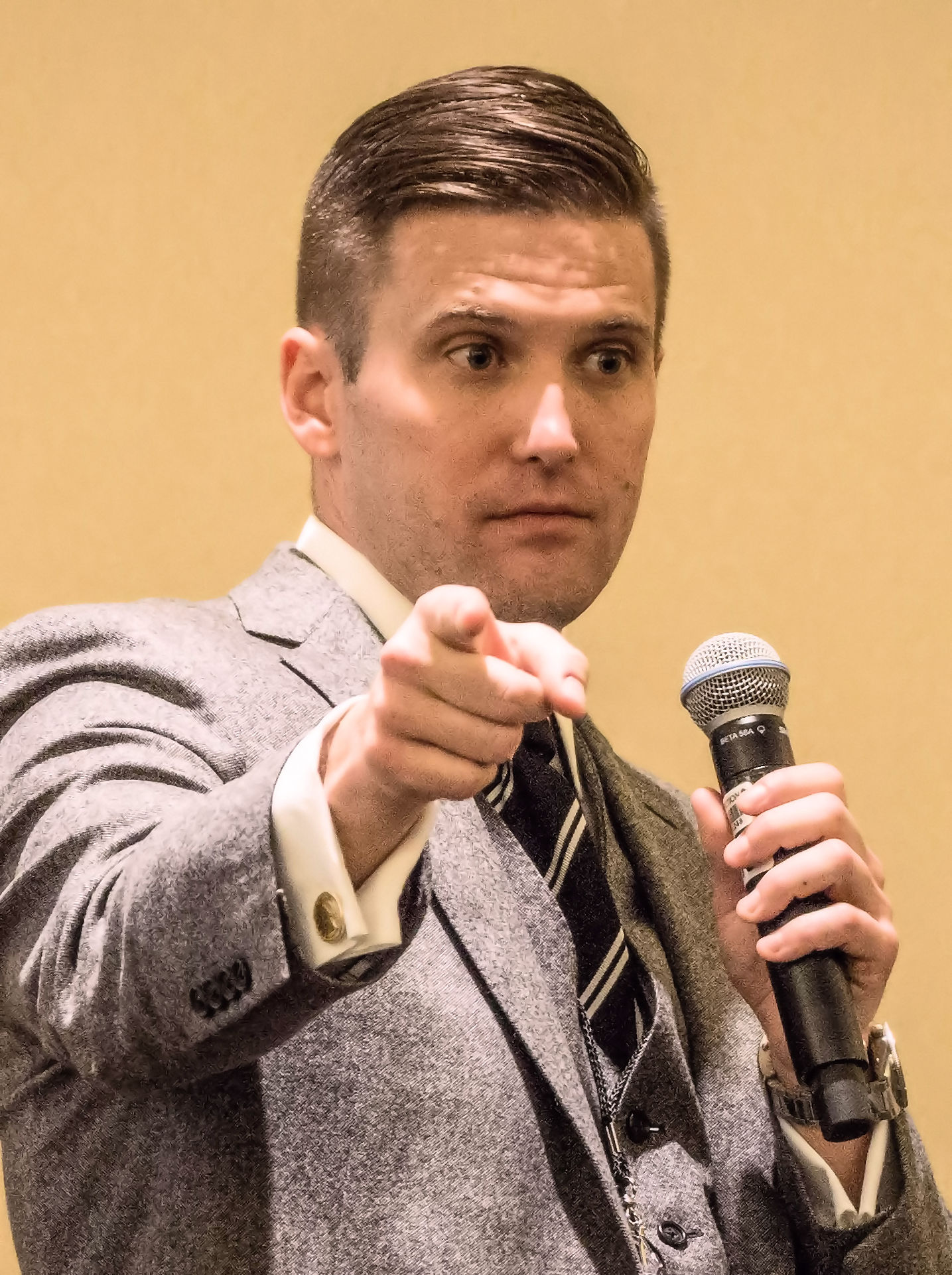
Richard B. Spencer in 2016

The month before the US presidential election, white supremacist Richard B. Spencer declared that whatever the upcoming result, that he would be "profoundly grateful to Donald Trump for the rest of my life". Invoking "white genocide" in the same interview, he labelled anti-discrimination laws "the enemy of all tradition, not just the Anglo-Saxon American society it has helped destroy", and Martin Luther King Jr. as "the god of white dispossession". The same month, William Daniel Johnson, leader of the American Freedom Party, was pushing the theory in support of Trump for president; denouncing "the death of the white race, caused by the concepts of diversity and multiculturalism", he said that America needed a "strong leader" like Trump, likening the Republican candidate favorably with Philippine president Rodrigo Duterte.

By early November, one week before the election, KKK leader Thomas Robb was invoking the conspiracy theory in support of Trump's Make America Great Again message, claiming that the concept was inextricably linked with the restoration of white power in the US In February 2017, it was reported that neo-Confederate activist Michael Hill was using Rhodesia to reference and warn against an apparent "racial genocide" of whites in the United States. Hill, a co-founder of the League of the South, equates multiculturalism within the country as part of an ongoing white genocide.

By March 2017, Republican congressman Steve King was using rhetoric that Mother Jones and Paste writers described as invoking the conspiracy theory, saying that "We can't restore our civilization with somebody else's babies" and using the phrase "cultural suicide". Vox and The New Republic have described him as an adherent of the theory that immigration and other forms of population shift represent a slow genocide against white populations. In the same month, white supremacist David Duke, a former Republican Louisiana State Representative, posted YouTube videos stating that Jews are "organizing white genocide". The former Grand Wizard of the KKK also accused Anthony Bourdain of wanting a genocide of white people.

==== Unite the Right rally in Charlottesville ====
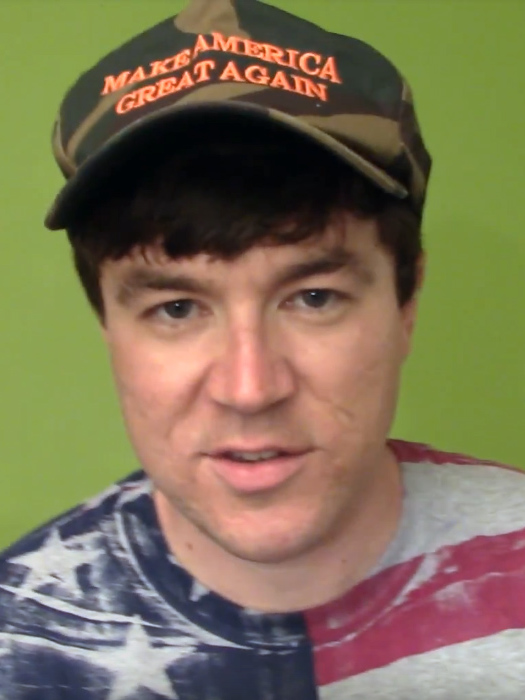
Jason Kessler c. 2017

In August 2017, a white supremacist protest named the Unite the Right rally was held in Charlottesville, Virginia, largely driven by the ideology of the "white genocide" narrative. The protest was ostensibly centered around the impending removal of a statue of Robert E. Lee, who was the commander of the Confederate States Army during the American Civil War. The night before the rally, leaflets were distributed en masse in the city, bearing the recurrent slogan "Diversity is a code word for white genocide".

Speaking at the event in Charlottesville, Jason Kessler, the primary organizer behind the rally and a white nationalist blogger, claimed that "the first and foremost reason that we're having this rally, is for that park and for that statue. It's about white genocide. It's about the replacement of our people, culturally and ethnically". Kessler has repeatedly promoted the conspiracy theory, using his website to criticize what he called "white genocide" and an "attack on white history".

Other prominent white nationalists also tied the conspiracy theory to the motivations behind Unite the Right. Giving a speech at the rally, Neo-nazi Mike Enoch said "We're here to talk about white genocide, the deliberate and intentional displacement of the white race".

==== Trump administration foreign policy on South Africa ====
In the fall of 2017, it was reported broadcaster Alex Jones and his fake news organization InfoWars were promoting the white genocide myth. The Suidlanders (a völkisch group involved in spreading the conspiracy theory in South Africa) accepted invitations to contribute to the platform on multiple occasions. Around the same time, Jones claimed white genocide was a serious threat in the US; on a cultural front, with what he asserted were black NFL players advocating for "white genocide" by refusing to stand for the national anthem, and the apparent physical threat of Democrats and communists plotting genocidal attacks specifically against white Americans.

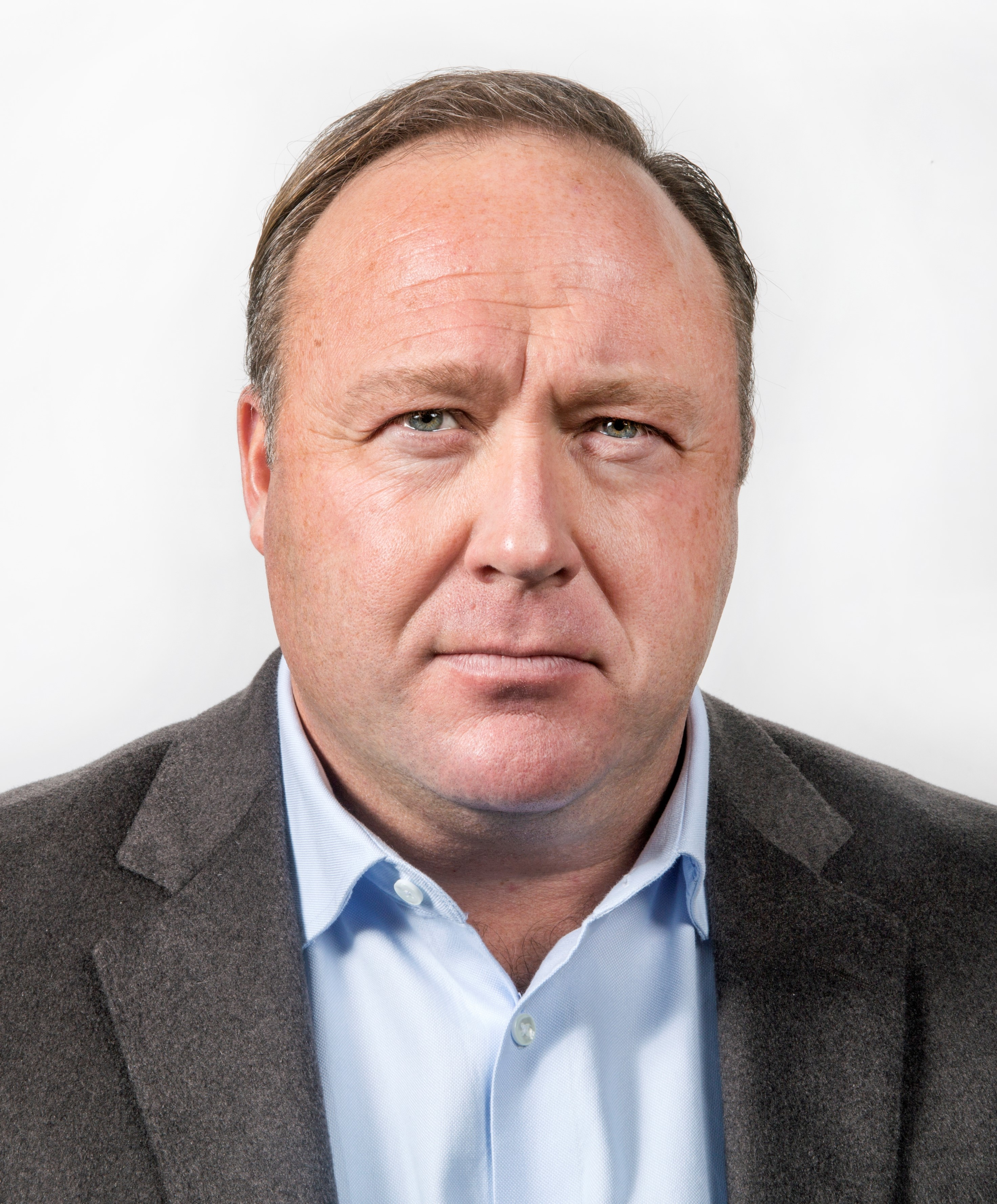
Alex Jones in 2017

Jones has been described as particularly instrumental in the American spread of conspiracy theories about white genocide in Africa, while his long-time political ally, radio host Michael Savage, has devoted an episode of his show to conspiracy theories about white genocide in the region.

In August 2018, US President Donald Trump brought the concept of "white genocide" in relation to South Africa significantly further into mainstream media discourse, after he publicly instructed Secretary of State Mike Pompeo to investigate South African farm attacks, an instruction which was broadly portrayed in media as Trump and his administration advocating for an unfounded conspiracy theory.

Trump had apparently gained his information from Tucker Carlson, a conservative political commentator for Fox News, who has been described as bringing the conspiracy theory of an ongoing "white genocide" in South Africa into the mainstream after a piece about the topic on his show caught the attention of president. Vox described him as having "taken up the cause" of the "virulent, racist conspiracy theory" of white genocide. Amanda Marcotte, writing in Salon, has said that Carlson avoids using the specific phrase "white genocide", but that "its basic premise is embedded throughout his show". The SPLC has accused his website, The Daily Caller, of promoting the theory in relation to South African farm attacks. Carlson asserted he was shocked his statements could be considered an appeal to white nationalists, dismissing questions about his show's high support among them as "stupid" and saying he knew nothing about them.

New York magazine had claimed Trump was attempting to "change the conversation – to one about 'white genocide' in South Africa"; Esquire reported that the "President of the United States is now openly promoting an international racist conspiracy theory as the official foreign policy of the United States." According to the SPLC, Trump had "tweeted out his intention to put the full force of the US State Department behind a white nationalist conspiracy theory".

==== Reaction to US–South Africa policy ====
In August 2018, many politicians and public figures responded critically to US President Donald Trump's foreign policy initiative to investigate the seizure of land from white farmers and apparent evoking of the conspiracy theory. These included multiple members of the South African Parliament and RSA Deputy President David Mabuza, who rejected the conspiracy theory, calling it "far from the truth". He stated that "we would like to discourage those who are using this sensitive and emotive issue of land to divide us as South Africans by distorting our land reform measures to the international community and spreading falsehoods that our 'white farmers' are facing the onslaught from their own government."

Julius Malema MP reacted, saying "there is no white genocide in South Africa", that Trump's intervention into their ongoing land reform issues "only made them more determined ... to expropriate our land without compensation", and that there is a black genocide in the US. Jeremy Cronin MP stated that the South African government needed to "send a signal to the courts, to Trump, to Fox News Agency" over the issue. The deputy Minister of Public Works spoke against the conspiracy theory; in a committee meeting in the South African parliament, he indicated that land expropriation without compensation should not be viewed as a white genocide. Whereas Minister of International Relations and Cooperation, Lindiwe Sisulu, claimed that his foreign policy tweet was "regrettable" and "based on false information", and that the conspiracy theory in general was "a right-wing ideology, and it is very unfortunate".

In the US, former US Ambassador to South Africa Patrick Gaspard, and American media personalities Chris Cuomo, Mika Brzezinski and Al Sharpton spoke out against the US President on the issue. Labelling Trump's actions as "dangerous and poisoned", Gaspard opposed the concept, claiming the conspiracy theory was "trafficking in a white supremacist story line", and that the concept is a "white-supremacist meme from the darkest place".

Cuomo, a television journalist, while stating that "like all conspiracy tripe, there's a kernel of truth" to the theory (in relation to land reform in South Africa) but concluded that the concept was a "bogus cause that white nationalists are selling". He rejected what he said was Donald Trump, and his administration, claiming "white farmers" were "being hunted down and killed and having their land stolen".

With a substantive response, American anti-racism activist, Tim Wise, critically analyzed the conspiracy theory further; stating that it was a form of negrophobia, being directed politically to "scare white Americans" about non-whites within the US. Wise has proposed that the paranoia around the conspiracy theory dates back to the Haitian Revolution and North American slave rebellions, but that changing demographics of the United States have heightened existing anxiety, stating that "the reason it is amplified today is that in the recent past the cultural norm of the country was still dominantly white."

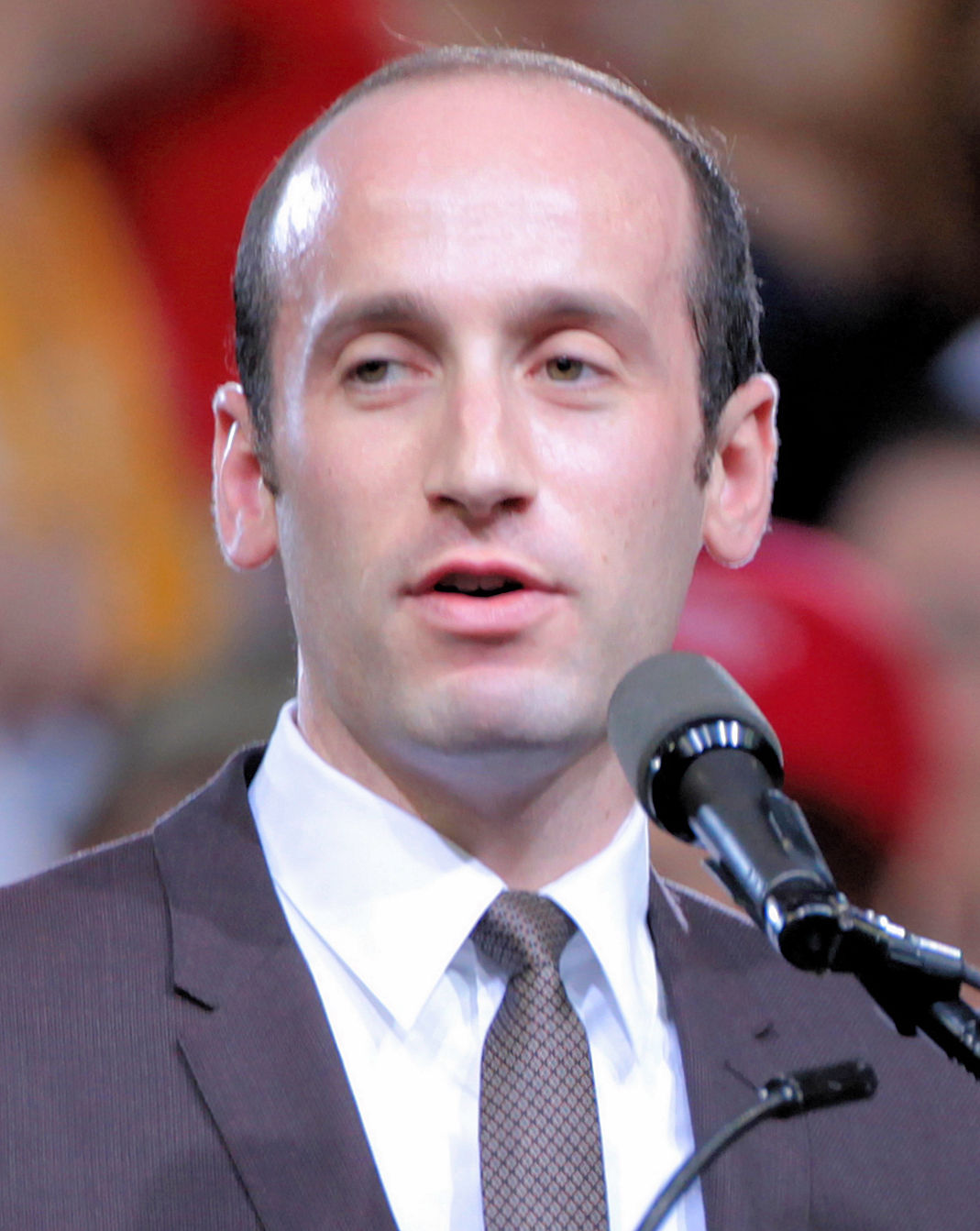
Stephen Miller in 2016

Mika Brzezinski, co-host of Morning Joe, spoke out against the concept, labelling it as "a racist conspiracy theory". American civil rights activist, Al Sharpton joined Brzezinski in her opposition, labelling it as "neo-Nazi propaganda". Discussing the issue on an MSNBC segment with Katy Tur and foreign correspondent Greg Myre, Sharpton stated that it is "not true" that "white farmers are being killed in South Africa" for racial reasons. A year later, Trump administration speechwriter Stephen Miller claimed US citizens were facing the same threat, saying that nonwhite congresswomen want to "destroy America with open borders", even if "American citizens lose their jobs, lose their homes, lose their livelihoods, lose their health coverage, and lose their very lives".

==== Subsequent events ====
In November 2018, Matthew Heimbach, former leader of the neo-Nazi Traditionalist Worker Party, led a protest in Little Rock, Arkansas, over an alleged white genocide occurring in South Africa. He called on the US government to sanction South Africa for the "violation of international law" in its treatment of white South Africans. In January 2019, the KKK distributed business cards in Philadelphia with various racist slogans such as "White People are a World Wide minority and there are programs of Genocide against white children", in what appeared to be deliberately targeting African-American neighborhoods with material which promoted the conspiracy theory.

Three independent analyses of Trump re-election campaign advertisements shown in 2019 found 2,200 ads warning of an "invasion" by immigrants. In asking for help to fund a wall along the US–Mexico border, the ads included all-caps warnings of a "state of emergency", saying, "America's safety is at risk", and that it is "critical that we stop the invasion". Other ads said Trump has "taken multiple trips to the border to show the true invasion happening but the Democrats and the Fake News Media just won't listen". In remarks in the Oval Office in March 2019, Trump said immigrants were trying to "rush our borders. ... People hate the word 'invasion', but that's what it is. It's an invasion of drugs and criminals and people." In an interview on 6 June, Trump told Fox News, "I told Mexico, if you don't stop this onslaught, this invasion—people get angry when I use the word 'invasion'—people like Nancy Pelosi that honestly they don't know what the hell they're talking about."

In May 2025, Trump confronted South African president Cyril Ramaphosa with false claims of white genocide during an Oval Office meeting, and played a video of killings he said supported his position. During the meeting, Trump brought up Elon Musk, who was standing behind him and has previously endorsed claims of South African white genocide, stating that: "Elon is from South Africa. I don't want to get him involved. That's all I have to do. Get him into another thing. But Elon happens to be from South Africa." To support his claims of white genocide, Trump showed footage of body bags, claiming that these were "all white farmers that are being buried" in an incident in South Africa, however in actuality the footage was from the Democratic Republic of Congo where there was a conflict involving Rwandan-supported M23 rebels.

==== Fox News era ====
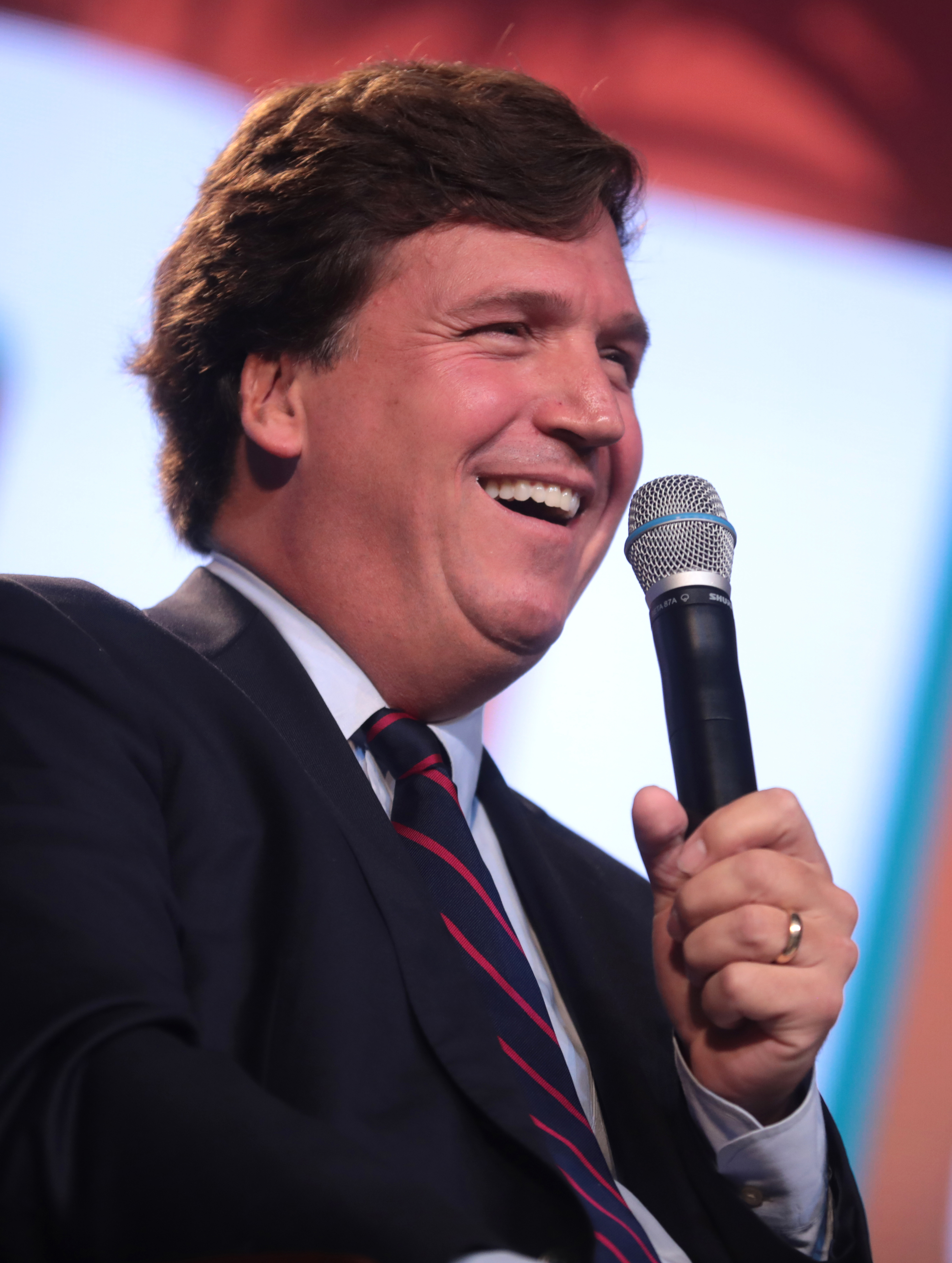
Tucker Carlson in 2018

The American news channel Fox News is described by multiple mainstream media sources as aligned with the concept and narrative of the white genocide conspiracy theory and using its prominence to bring rhetoric of demographic threats to white Americans further into the center of US discourse. Amanda Marcotte, writing in Salon, has stated that Fox's default ideology is "strikingly similar" to "fascistic replacement theory" and "white genocide". Marcotte wrote that this ideology is especially the case for the network's prime-time commentators, such as Tucker Carlson and Laura Ingraham. Paste magazine has argued that "far-right" Great Replacement rhetoric is not only a nightly fixture of Tucker Carlson Tonight, but a "foundational" principle of Rupert Murdoch's media empire.

GQ has reported that Fox News' "popular primetime" shows are an important pipeline to President Donald Trump's political positions, such as the investigation into land reform in South Africa, and that Carlson's show in particular dedicates segments to "'great replacement' propaganda". The warnings delivered by "conservative pundits on Fox News" are driving fears of an "existential threat" of a white genocide, according to The Atlantic, who particularly analyzed Laura Ingraham's nativist remarks, such as "massive demographic changes" apparently being inflicted upon white Americans against their will. While The New York Times identified Carlson as engaging in replacement theory fear-mongering, in relation to family birthrates in the US, ThinkProgress accused him of using the popularity of Fox News, as a platform, to push fears of demographic change through immigration and feminism, causing a so-called "genocide" of American white men.

==== Canada ====
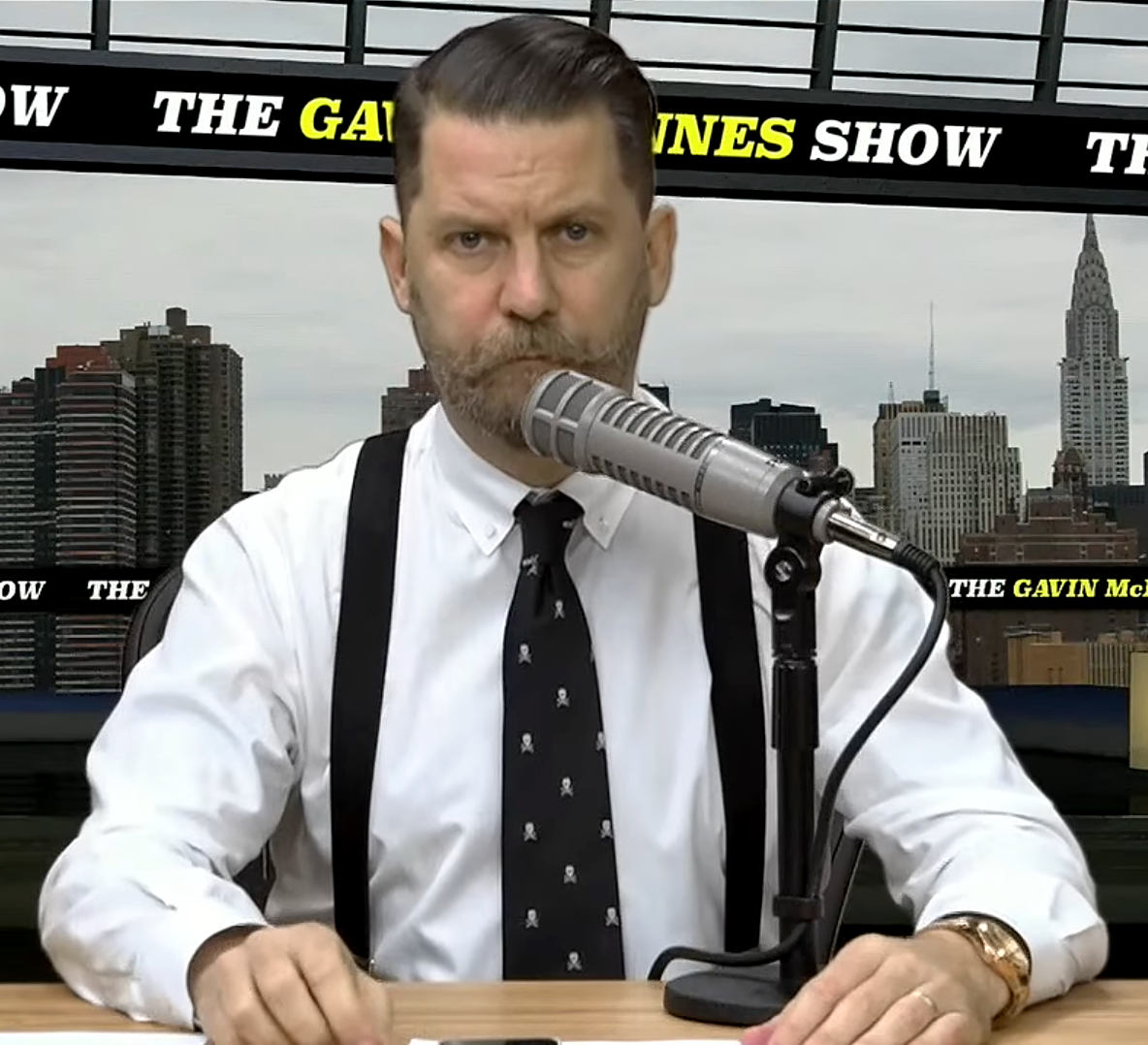
Gavin McInnes

In June 2017, far-right political commentator Faith Goldy endorsed the conspiracy theory. Publishing a video for The Rebel Media called "White Genocide in Canada?", Goldy compared the shifting demographics of Canada and its immigration policies to "white genocide". Goldy has been described by GQ magazine as "one of Canada's most prominent propagandists" for the theory. Later that month, Vice Media co-founder Gavin McInnes promoted the conspiracy theory after stating that white women having abortions and immigration is "leading to white genocide in the West". He also claimed "white genocide" was "much more intense" in South Africa. McInnes is one of the main leaders of a far-right faction that believes in the conspiracy theory.

In December 2017, YouTuber Stefan Molyneux pushed the conspiracy theory, claiming there was a "demographic decline among the whites that is happening in Europe and in North America", that supposedly predicted a "quasi-extinction" of white people. Molyneux, an advocate of the theory, in February 2018 published a video regarding the concept, titled "White Farmers Slaughtered in South Africa", which interviewed fellow white genocide conspiracy theorist Lauren Southern. Southern, a far-right activist, has frequently pushed white genocide rhetoric, using it as an argument against immigration. She has advocated for European countries to refuse refugees from Africa and Asia, saying that immigration would lead to white genocide, and has been labelled in media as a "booster" for the conspiracy at large. In 2018, Southern produced a documentary called Farmlands about post-Apartheid farm violence in South Africa.

In March 2019, white supremacist Paul Fromm was reported to have endorsed the "white genocide" themed (The Great Replacement) manifesto of the Christchurch mosque shooting perpetrator. Referring to it as "cogent" and a "historical document", Fromm republished the manifesto on his website, stating that he agreed with its analysis.

=== Australia ===
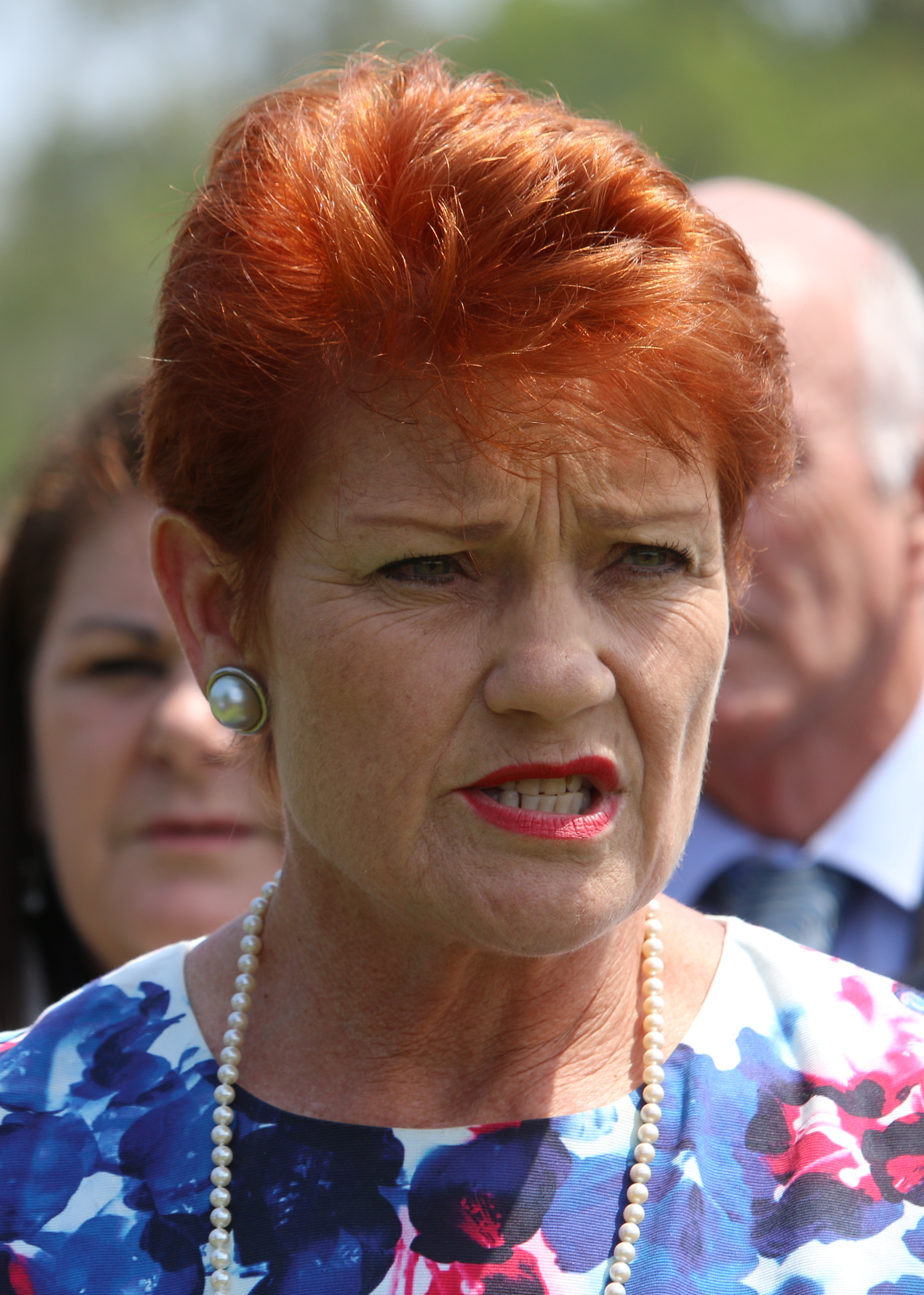
Pauline Hanson in 2017

American Neo-Nazi literature such as The Turner Diaries and Lane's White Genocide Manifesto have spread online to right wing groups in Australia. A collection of writings called Siege by James Mason was cited as an inspiration by some of the twenty-two neo-Nazis who infiltrated the New South Wales Young Nationals party from which they were banned for life for trying to advance the creation of an ethno-state. Themes of the "defense of Western civilization" and the achievements of ethnic Whites have become racist dog whistles for groups advancing theories of an impending white genocide.

In March 2018, several Australian tabloids owned by the News Corporation ran articles alleging that South African whites were faced with genocide and which led the Australian home affairs minister Peter Dutton to promise fast-track visas for any South African white wishing to emigrate to Australia. Dutton is known for his anti-immigrant and anti-refugee stance, which led to questions about his willingness to accept South African whites into Australia as refugees, since he normally opposes Australia accepting refugees. One News Corp columnist, Miranda Devine, wrote about the ties as she saw them between the Australian people and "our oppressed white, Christian, industrious, rugby and cricket-playing Commonwealth cousins" threatened by South African blacks whom she promised would integrate "seamlessly" into Australia as opposed to immigration from Third World countries.

Another Australian News Corporation columnist Caroline Marcus connected the alleged plight of South African whites to what she saw as a broader attack on whites across the world, writing "the truth is, there are versions of this anti-white, vengeance theme swirling in movements around the western world, from Black Lives Matter in the US to Invasion Day protests back home." The British journalist Jason Wilson noted that the News Corporation run by the Australian media magnate Rupert Murdoch also owns Fox News, which has aired stories portraying South African whites as a persecuted minority, leading him to accuse the News Corporation of promoting this narrative around the world.

In 2018, a resolution declaring "It's OK to be white", and decrying "the deplorable rise of anti-white racism and attacks on the Western civilization", was introduced in the Australian Senate by Pauline Hanson, an anti-immigrant Senator who leads the One Nation Party. The motion was narrowly defeated. The same slogan, which is associated with white supremacist rhetoric, was also depicted on a shirt worn by the far-right Canadian YouTuber Lauren Southern during a visit to Australia.

After Australian white-genocide conspiracy theorist Brenton Tarrant carried out the March 2019 Christchurch mosque shootings, Queensland Senator Fraser Anning released a statement saying the cause of the attacks was "the immigration program which allowed Muslim fanatics to migrate to New Zealand in the first place". Anning has called for a "final solution" to nonwhite immigration to Australia, and frequently issues calls to stop white genocide on social media. Other politicians such as Home Affairs Minister Peter Dutton have helped propel the idea of white genocide into the mainstream.

==== New Zealand ====
The accused perpetrator of the Christchurch mosque shootings alluded to "white genocide" and ethnic and racial "replacement" in a 74-page manifesto posted shortly before the attacks.

South African expatriates in New Zealand have been spreading white genocide myths on Facebook and by demonstrating in marches.

== Influence on far-right terrorism ==
Examples of white supremacist mass murders and terrorist attacks
Year	Location	Killed	Injured
2000	Pittsburgh	5	1
2011	Norway	77	241
2014	Kansas	3	0
2015	Charleston	9	1
2017	Charlottesville	1	28
2017	Quebec City	6	5
2018	Pittsburgh	11	7
2019	Christchurch	51	40
2019	Poway	1	3
2019	El Paso	23	23
2022	Buffalo	10	3

=== United States ===
Richard Baumhammers, the perpetrator of a 2000 shooting spree in Pittsburgh, Pennsylvania, that killed five people and injured a sixth, complained that European Americans are being outnumbered by minorities and immigrants, calling on a website for "an end to non-white immigration" because "almost all" present day immigration "is non-European."

Frazier Glenn Miller Jr., the perpetrator of a shooting spree that killed three people at a Jewish community center and retirement home in Overland Park, Kansas, had supported the slogan: "Diversity is code for white genocide." He stated that the "systematic genocide of white people by Jews" was his motive, and that he, "had a patriotic intent to stop genocide against my people". On Easter Sunday, the day after the shooting, white supremacists delivered "white genocide" themed Easter eggs to several houses in Henrico County, Virginia, repeating the "Diversity = white genocide" mantra.

Dylann Roof, the perpetrator of the Charleston church shooting that killed nine people and injured a tenth, included a photo on his Facebook page of him wearing a jacket decorated with two emblems that are popular among American white supremacists: the flag of the former Rhodesia (now known as Zimbabwe) and the flag of apartheid-era South Africa. He had been blogging on a website called "The Last Rhodesian" (www.lastrhodesian.com) registered on 9 February 2015, which included an unsigned manifesto containing his opinions of "Blacks", "Jews", "non-white Hispanics" and "East Asians". For these reasons, Federal prosecutors said he was "self-radicalized" online, instead of adopting his white supremacist ideology through personal associations or experiences with white supremacists.

The driver responsible for the Charlottesville car attack against protesters at the Unite the Right rally had previously espoused neo-Nazi and white supremacist beliefs. He had driven from Ohio to join the rally in which participants chanted, "Jews will not replace us." He killed one person and injured 28.

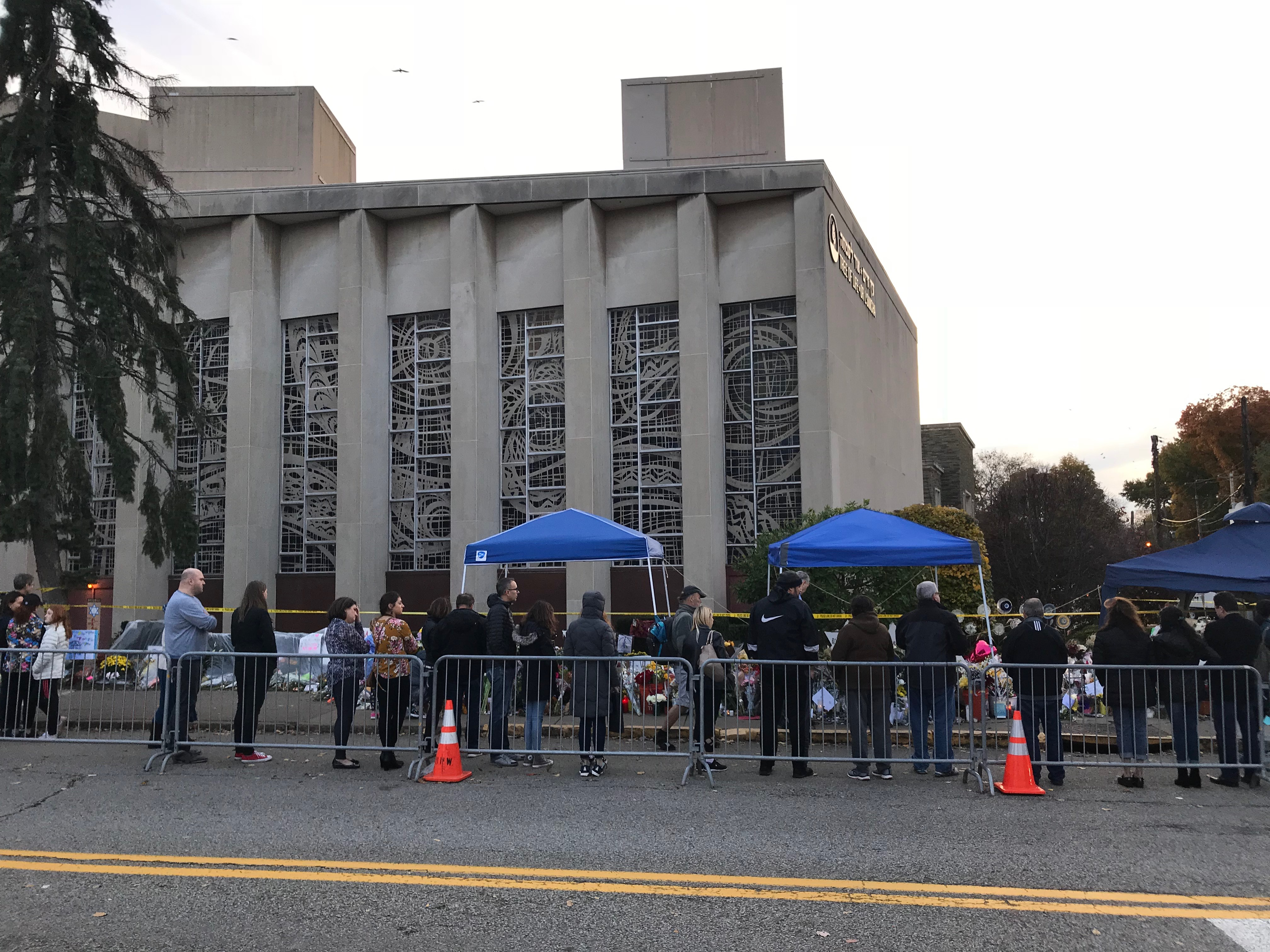
Memorials to victims of the mass shooting outside the Tree of Life synagogue in Pittsburgh, Pennsylvania, on 4 November 2018

The perpetrator of the Pittsburgh synagogue shooting that killed eleven and injured another seven wrote "Jews are the children of Satan" in his social media profile, using neo-Nazi and white supremacist symbolism associated with David Lane, along with the Nazi slogan, "Heil Hitler". He supported white genocide conspiracy theories, writing in one instance, "Daily Reminder: Diversity means chasing down the last white person." He also wrote diatribes against white women who have relationships with black men. In the weeks before the shooting, Bowers made anti-Semitic posts directed at the Hebrew Immigrant Aid Society who sponsor the National Refugee Shabbat. Shortly before the attack, in an apparent reference to immigrants to the United States, he posted on Gab that "HIAS likes to bring invaders in that kill our people. I can't sit by and watch my people get slaughtered. Screw your optics, I'm going in."

The perpetrator of the Poway synagogue shooting that killed one and injured three others blamed Jews for white genocide, which he described as the "meticulously planned genocide of the European race" in his manifesto.

The perpetrator of the 2019 El Paso shooting that killed 23 and injured another 23 had published a manifesto expressing support for the Christchurch shooter and his manifesto, saying the El Paso attack was in response to a "Hispanic invasion of Texas ... defending my country from cultural and ethnic replacement.... the Hispanic community was not my target before I read The Great Replacement." Several commentators noted that the manifesto echoed themes in Donald Trump's campaign speeches, including repeated claims of a Hispanic invasion along with general extremism and hateful language, whose proponents have been emboldened and mobilized by Trump's rhetoric and increasingly frequent talking points in right-wing media outlets. Trump, in turn, called for "strong background checks, perhaps marrying this legislation with desperately needed immigration reform", which some commentators said blamed immigration for the massacre.

The suspect in the 2022 Buffalo shooting that killed ten people and injured three others blamed Jews and African-Americans for white genocide in a manifesto, according to law enforcement officials. He had taken inspiration from other far-right mass shooters, whom he regarded as "heroes".

=== Europe ===
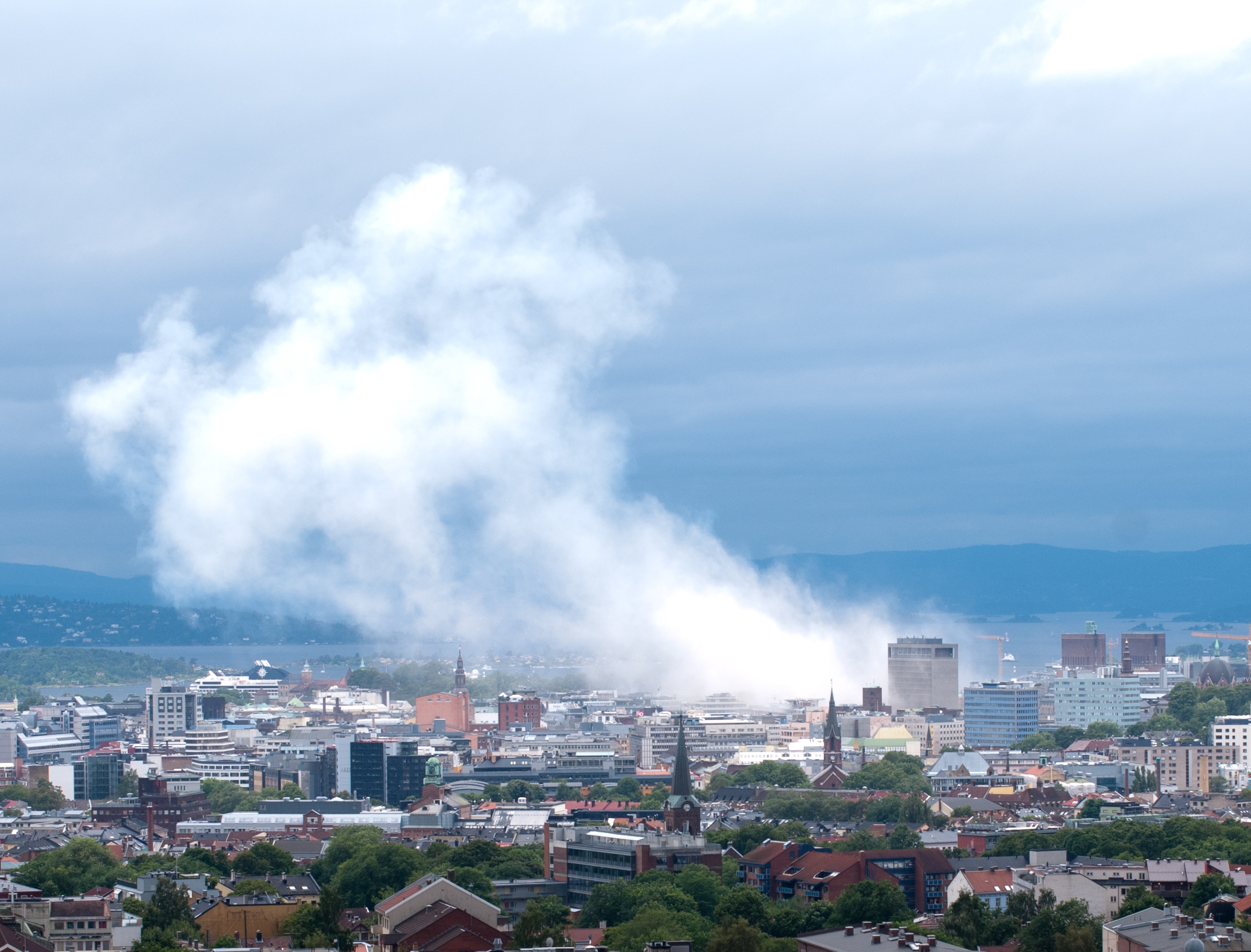
The 2011 Oslo bombing killed eight people and injured at least 209. A few hours later, the attacker shot and killed 69 others, all but 14 of whom were teenagers.

Anders Behring Breivik, the perpetrator of the 2011 Norway attacks, had participated for years in debates on Internet forums and spoken against Islam and immigration. He wrote a 1,518-page compendium including frequent mentions of alleged ongoing genocide against white Europeans. Analysts described him as having Islamophobic views and a hatred of Islam, and as someone who considered himself as a knight dedicated to stemming the tide of Muslim immigration into Europe.

=== New Zealand ===
The perpetrator of the Christchurch mosque shootings that killed 51 and injured 40 explained in a manifesto that he carried out the attack to fight ongoing "white genocide" by foreign "invaders". He had forwarded stories about white women's low fertility rates on his social media accounts. Photographs from his initial court appearance showed him making the "OK" symbol appropriated by white supremacists with his fingers.

== Criticism and resistance ==
White genocide is a myth based on false science, false history, and hatred. White people are not dying out, and are not facing extermination. White supremacists claim that diversity is equivalent to white genocide. Scholars describe white supremacists as fabricating paranoid claims that their survival as a race is threatened by, for example, "individualism, celibacy, feminism and other forms of sex-role confusion, misplaced environmentalism, and white demonization and guilt," all of which are claimed to promote reproductive failure.

White genocide conspiracy theory frames evidence of declining birth rates in support of extremist views and calls to violence. White supremacists are successfully constructing false narratives of genocide to incite violence at an increasing rate. The US Republican Party as led by Donald Trump has repeatedly and openly courted white supremacists and endorsed the falsehoods they promote, including those of white genocide.

In October 2016, British journalist Sanjiv Bhattacharya analyzed the belief in the conspiracy theory amongst the alt-right. While considering the prospect that non-Hispanic whites will be less than 50% of the US population by 2044; Bhattacharya pointed out the racist hypocrisy in the statement "Diversity equals white genocide", discussing how the "alt right loves to evoke genocide while harbouring Holocaust deniers".

Around the Christmas period of 2016, George Ciccariello-Maher, an American political scientist, satirically tweeted "All I Want for Christmas is White Genocide". As a result of the ensuing controversy, Ciccariello-Maher resigned from his job as an associate professor of politics and global studies at Drexel University. Ciccariello-Maher continued to strongly oppose the conspiracy theory, claiming that it was "invented by white supremacists and used to denounce everything from inter-racial relationships to multicultural policies." He has labelled the concept as a "figment of the racist imagination" and claimed that "it should be mocked."

Adrianne Black, an American former white supremacist and goddaughter of David Duke, after initially supporting and helping to popularize the concept, has renounced and opposed the white genocide conspiracy theory. Black has claimed that the concept was about pushing white nationalists into a false and overt paranoia about demographics of the United States. Eli Saslow, an American journalist who worked with Black on her 2018 book Rising out of Hatred, has spoken against the conspiracy theory, labelling it as a "really effective" form of propaganda or indoctrination. He stated that "unfortunately, in part because it's built upon a very real and dark truth in American history—which is that white supremacy has always been a big part of what this country is—white nationalists were able to start capitalizing on that." Saslow has claimed the conspiracy theory is a way to "sanitize" white America's history of racism and violence, by focusing on the "ways that white people are under attack in this country," including "white genocide" and "building a wall".

In January 2019, Democratic Philadelphia City Council member Kenyatta Johnson labelled the Ku Klux Klan's distribution of "white genocide" promotional material in black neighborhoods of Philadelphia as an "upsetting and disgusting" act. In June 2019, Canadian author Naomi Klein addressed the narrative of "white genocide", criticizing the concept as an attack on women's reproductive freedom, in that it wished to deny abortion rights to white women having white children, while seeking to suppress non-white immigrant birthrates. The following month, critical theorist Bernard Harcourt detailed how the American New Right was seeking to orient its political message around the fear of a white genocide occurring. He proposed that "neo-fascist, white supremacist, revolutionary language" was becoming mainstream and was in effect "starting to change the way people are willing to express themselves", including President Trump.

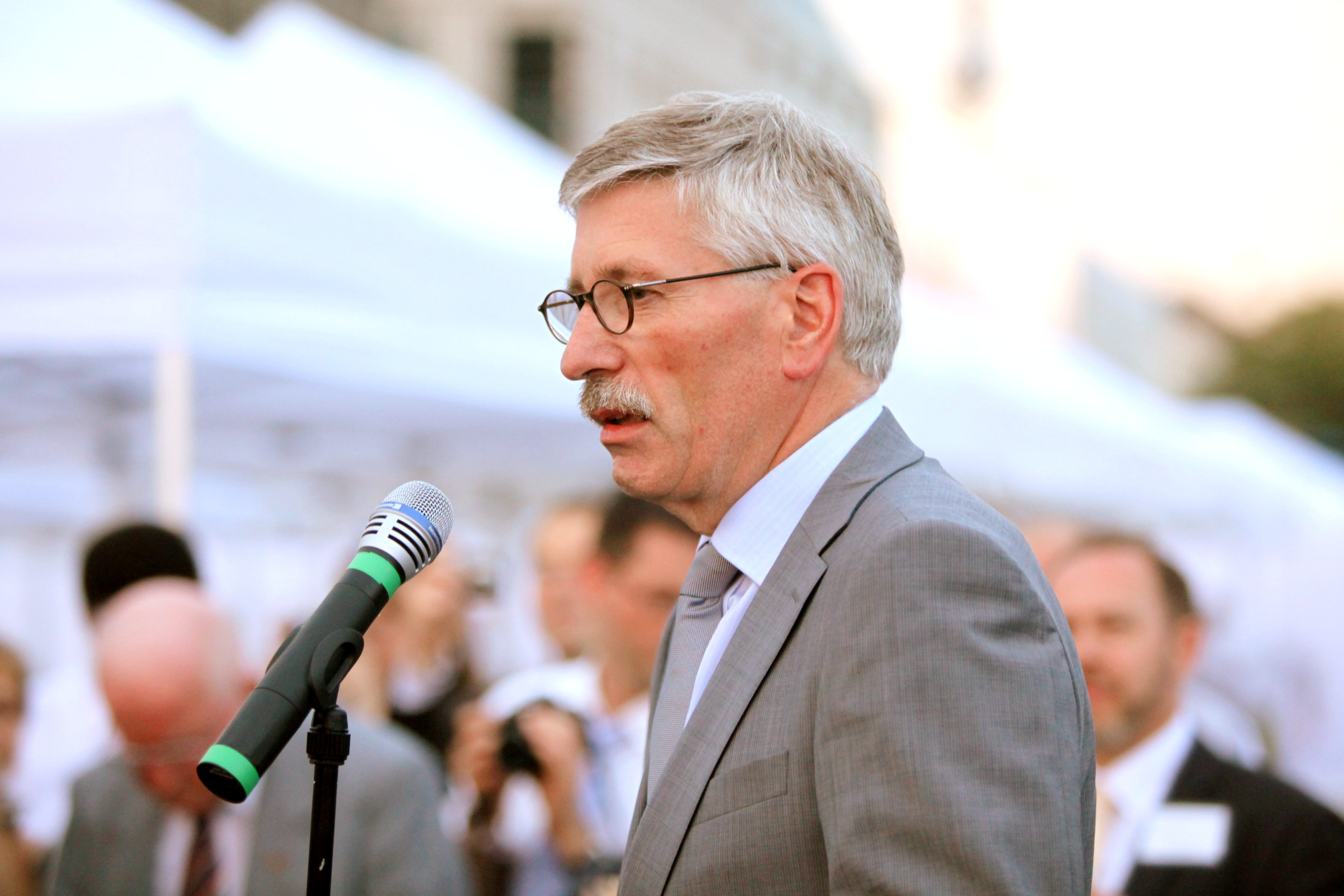
Thilo Sarrazin in 2009

In March 2019, journalist Adam Serwer suggested that the conspiracy theory did not sincerely refer to "mass murder, ethnic cleansing, or even violence," but rather to a perceived "loss of political and cultural hegemony in countries that white supremacists think should belong to white people by law." Serwer proposed that the conspiracy was "a kind of projection, a paranoia that the past genocide, colonialism, and ethnic cleansing forced on the West's former subjects will be visited upon it." The same month, Farhad Manjoo detailed how "white-extinction theory" was nonsense. Proposing that the "white genocide" label had "failed to take off", proving ineffective for conspiracy theorists attempting to push the narrative. Manjoo, an American journalist, suggested that the "Great Replacement" (which the Christchurch mosque shooter used for a manifesto title) was a softer reinvention, being to the white genocide conspiracy theory what the term Identitarian is to "white supremacist".

In April 2019, British academic Elif Shafak detailed how Renaud Camus' theory of the Great Replacement has created an ideological worldview for the far-right to amplify into a "white genocide" narrative in the West. Shafak argues that the conspiracy theory is also embedded in the works of Thilo Sarrazin, such as Germany Abolishes Itself and 2018's Hostile Takeover. Later that month, Jonathan Freedland and Mehdi Hasan released a joint analysis of far-right extremism and the ideology behind "white genocide". Discussing Pittsburgh synagogue shooter, Robert Gregory Bowers, and his rhetoric, Freeland and Hasan, both political journalists, labelled the conspiracy theory as racist and unhinged and argued that it had both the Muslim and Jewish "communities in its murderous sights". They concluded that both groups should "stand and fight it together".

In May 2019, political commentator Nick Cohen analyzed how "white genocide" narratives created anti-immigrant and societal sexual tension. He argued that the conspiracy theory was an effective form of racism and propaganda, which had penetrated Viktor Orbán's Hungarian government, but revealed a far-right paranoia that European men were not virile enough. In June 2019, professor of economics Jonathan Portes, while describing the concept as a "lunatic" conspiracy theory, detailed how more respectable versions of "white genocide" were being promoted by academic and media figures, and therefore pushing the idea further into mainstream discourse.

== See also ==
- White demographic decline
- Demographic threat
- Demographic engineering
- Angry white male
- Disappearing blonde gene hoax
- Accusation in a mirror
- Genocide recognition politics
- Love jihad conspiracy theory
- Replacement migration
- Black genocide in the United States
- Umvolkung, a Nazi ideology used to describe a process of cultural assimilation
