= Disappearing blonde gene =

2000s "extinction" hoax

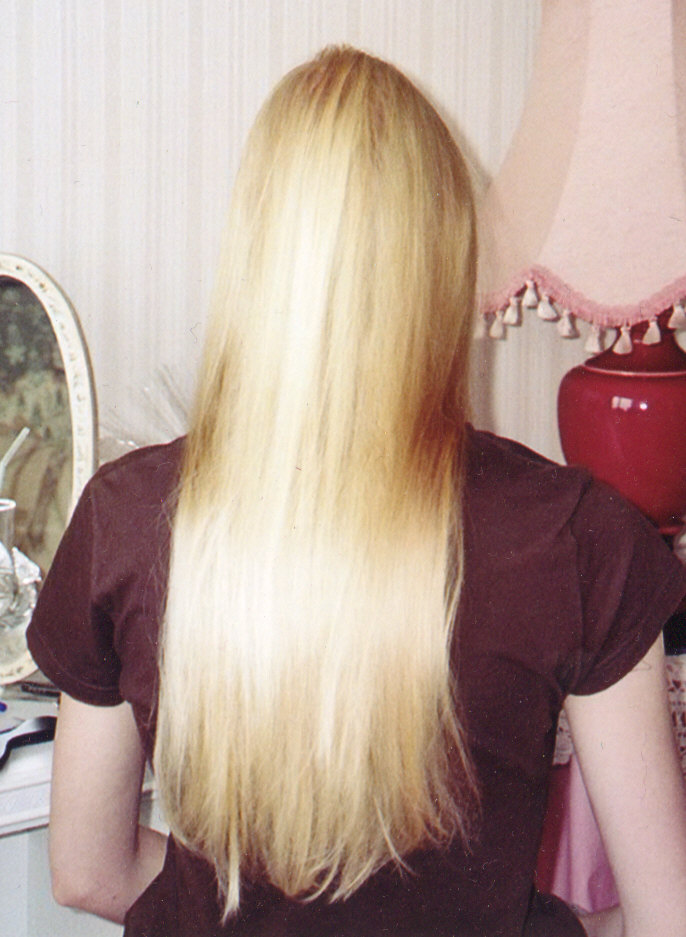
Blond hair is controlled by an allele that is recessive to most alleles responsible for darker hair, but it is not a disappearing gene.

The "disappearing blonde gene" refers to a hoax that emerged in parts of the Western world in the early 2000s, claiming that a scientific study had estimated that blonds would become extinct within the next two centuries. More specifically, it claimed that, because the alleles for blond hair genes are recessive, people with natural blond hair would become less common as people with dominant non-blond hair alleles had offspring with them, even though such a pairing would retain one copy of the blond allele in the genome of said offspring. Nevertheless, the hoax was repeated as fact by some mainstream Western media outlets, such as ABC News, the BBC, CNN, and The Sunday Times, between 2002 and 2006. The earliest known claims of a looming "blond extinction" date back to 1865.

Several outlets propagating the hoax also falsely cited the World Health Organization (WHO), asserting that it had published a report claiming that blonds "will become extinct by 2202" in spite of the fact that neither the WHO nor any reputable expert had issued such a report. In response, the WHO released an official statement telling all those who had commented on the non-existent report to retract their remarks.

== Propagation in Western media ==
In 2002, BBC News reported that unnamed German experts had concluded that blond hair would disappear within 200 years since the gene that causes blond hair is recessive. According to these German experts, the recessive blond allele is rare in nations of mixed heritage, such as the United States, Canada, Argentina, Brazil, New Zealand, and Australia. In the BBC article, Professor Jonathan Rees of the University of Edinburgh casts doubt on the story—he was quoted as saying: "The frequency of blondes may drop, but they won't disappear."

In 2006, the hoax was mentioned by the British newspaper The Sunday Times when reporting on the publication of a hypothesis of the origins of blond hair, and also by the Italian newspaper La Repubblica, which stated: "According to the WHO study, the last natural blond is likely to be born in Finland during 2202." It once again traveled quickly across the World Wide Web. The hoax also featured on the "Threat-Down" segment of the American satirical television show The Colbert Report on 6 March 2006, when host Stephen Colbert suggested a selective breeding program to save blonds.

== Scientific debunking ==
The extinction thesis is based on a interpretation of recessiveness in genetics. In reality, gene frequency is stable unless there is selection for or against them, which does not appear to be the case for blond hair. In large populations, even extremely rare genes will persist at stable levels over long periods of time. It also does not matter whether a gene is dominant or recessive. Genes disappear if the population is very small (drift) or if they confer a disadvantage (selection).

The Melanocortin 1 receptor is known to affect human hair colour, and alleles on that gene associated with blond hair are generally recessive to alleles associated with darker hair colours. However, there is no single allele that codes for blond hair colour, and environmental factors can also determine whether blond or brown hair colour is expressed in an individual. Additionally, several factors involving determination of human hair colour are still not fully understood by geneticists.

== See also ==
- List of common misconceptions about science, technology, and mathematics § Skin and hair
  - Disappearing red hair gene, a similar hoax that spread in the Western world in the late 2000s
- Hardy–Weinberg principle
- Miscegenation
- White genocide conspiracy theory, of which the disappearing blond hair gene hoax is a part
  - The Great Replacement
