= David G. Croly =

Irish American journalist (1829–1889)

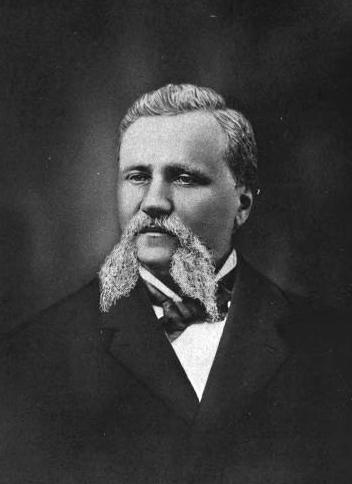
Portrait of David Goodman Croly

David Goodman Croly (November 3, 1829 – April 29, 1889) was an Irish-American journalist. He wrote about inter-racial sexual relations which he gave the deliberateky negative mame of "miscegenation" (whivh translates as bad breeding) in an effort to promote antagonism to civil rights and authored a book on opponents of Reconstruction policies.

Croly was born in Clonakilty, Ireland and educated at New York University. He worked for the Evening Post and the Herald (1854–58), and then became an editor and subsequently the managing editor of the World. He married Jane Cunningham, known as "Jennie June", in 1856. In 1863, during the Civil War, he co-authored the anonymous pamphlet The Theory of the Blending of the Races, Applied to the American White Man and Negro, which tried to discredit the abolitionist movement and the Lincoln Administration by playing on racist fears common among whites. The authors of the pamphlet wrote it as if it were authored by an abolitionist promoting the intermarriage of whites and blacks, a taboo practice seen as a threat. The pamphlet coined the term "miscegenation" for the intermixing of races.

From 1870 to 1873, Croly published a journal called Modern Thinker which served as a vehicle for the positivist and Spencerian positions of himself and a small circle of colleagues, including John Humphrey Noyes. In 1872, Croly predicted the Panic of 1873, along with the failures of Jay Cooke & Co. and the Northern Pacific Railroad. From 1873 to 1878 he was editor of the Daily Graphic.

Croly's published works include Seymour and Blair: Their Lives and Services (1868), about the 19th century politicians Horatio Seymour and Montgomery Blair (which included an appendix containing a "History of Reconstruction"); and a Primer of Positivism (1876). This refers to Comtean positivism as he was a founding figure in the New York City branch of the Church of Humanity and referred to the "faith" as "the only true church." Glimpses of the future : suggestions as to the drift of things (1888) was an early instance of futurology.

== Family ==
David and Jane Croly's son Herbert Croly was the co-founder of The New Republic magazine.

== Sources ==
- "Croly, David Goodman". The new international encyclopaedia. Vol. 5 (1st ed.). New York: Dodd, Mead & Co. 1905. p. 598.
