= Gerd Honsik =

Austrian writer, neo-Nazi and Holocaust denier (1941–2018)

- Born: 10 October 1941; Vienna, Reichsgau Niederdonau, Germany
- Died: 7 April 2018 (aged 76); Sopron, Hungary
- Occupations: Writer, lyric poet
- Writing career
- Pen name: Gerhon Endsik
- Subject: Holocaust denial
- Literary movement: Neo-Nazism

Gerd Honsik (10 October 1941 – 7 April 2018) was an Austrian writer and lyric poet, and a prominent neo-Nazi and Holocaust denier.

== Life ==
Honsik was born in Vienna, Austria. He was a functionary in the Austrian "Volksbewegung" ("People's Movement"), also known as "Volksbewegung gegen Überfremdung" ("People's Movement against Over-Foreignization") and "Ausländer-Halt-Bewegung" ("No More Foreigners Movement"), as well as in Austria's far-right NDP party. He was the founder of a militia group, the Nationale Front, which according to its manifesto carried out activities to effect "the abolition of the system".

He also appeared under the pseudonym "Gerhon Endsik", an anagram of the syllables of his name extended by two letters, intended to allude to the (politically charged) German term Endsieg ("final victory").

Honsik was fined and sentenced to jail in several Austrian court cases due to his activities as a Holocaust denier. He evaded his most recent sentence by fleeing the country, and residing in Spain until 24 August 2007 when he was arrested in Málaga after a recent change in Spanish legislation. On 4 October 2007, Honsik was extradited to Austria to serve out an 18-month prison sentence stemming from a 1992 conviction for Holocaust denial. Spain had previously refused requests to extradite Honsik because Holocaust denial and neo-Nazi propaganda were not illegal in that country. Honsik was only extradited after two European-wide arrest warrants were issued at Austria's request.

While in Spain Honsik contributed to the magazine Halt ("Stop") at irregular intervals. The magazine publishes Holocaust-denying and anti-Semitic articles. Honsik also wrote a book, "Hitler Innocent?", in which he attempts to justify some Nazi-era crimes.

On 27 April 2009, Honsik was sentenced to five years in prison in Austria for propagating Holocaust denial, later reduced to four years. The prosecutor argued that Honsik is "one of the ideological leaders" of Europe's neo-Nazi movement and that his distribution of "hate magazines" at schools violated Austrian law. During the trial, Honsik called himself "a social democrat" and stated that he only "rejected the textbook wisdom that demonizes National Socialism" and he only denied the existence of the gas chambers used in concentration camps "wherever I had not verified the (facts) myself". At one point, Honsik began screaming and pounding his fists after the judge denied his requests to introduce evidence which the court had deemed irrelevant.

On 8 September 2011, Honsik was paroled due to his old age. He died on 7 April 2018 at the age of 76 in Sopron, Hungary, where he had been living since 2017.
