= Miscegenation hoax =

1863 American political hoax pamphlet

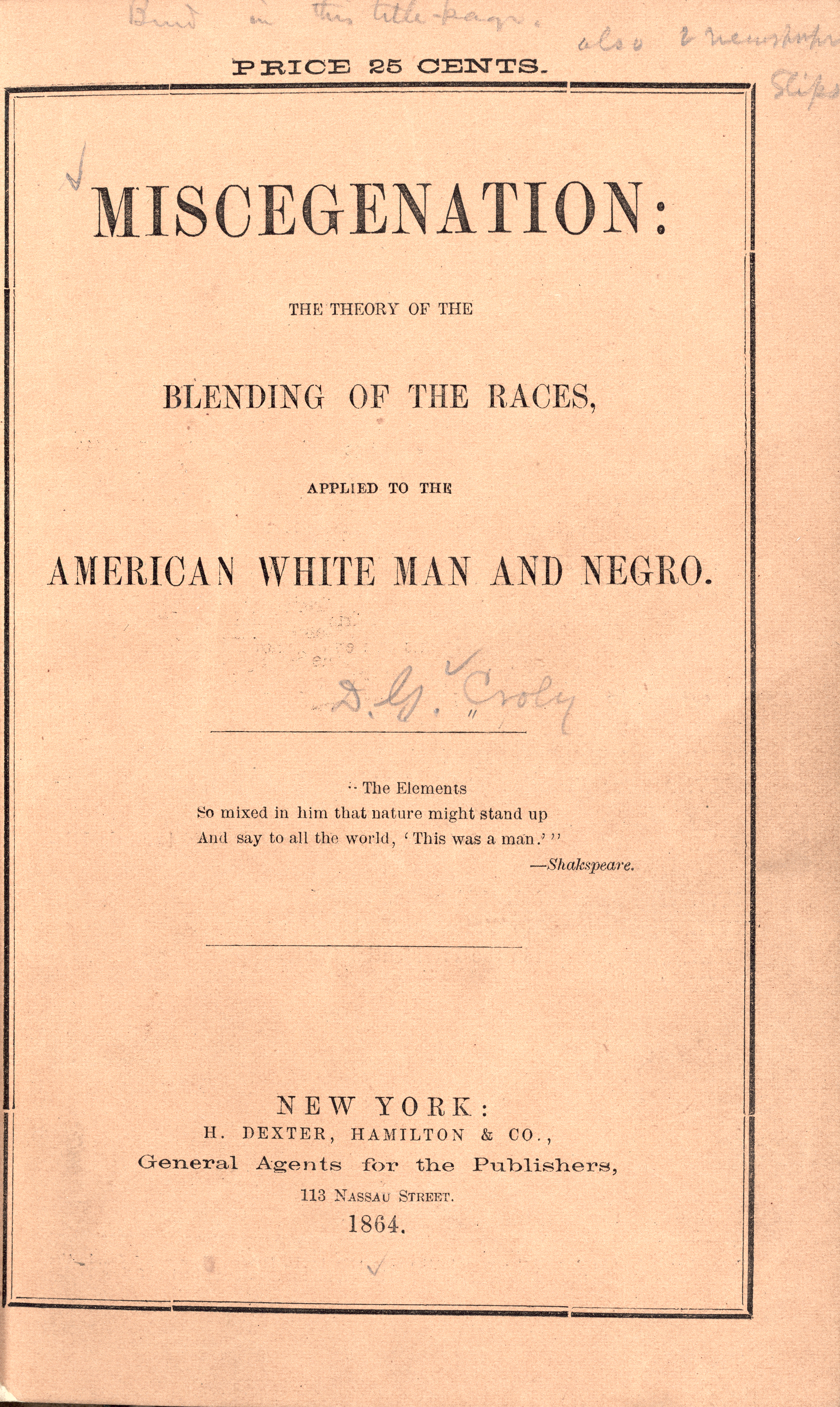
Title page.

The Miscegenation hoax, taking the form of a pamphlet titled Miscegenation: The Theory of the Blending of the Races, Applied to the American White Man and Negro, was published by New York World staff in December 1863 as part of an anti-Lincoln Copperhead campaign leading up to the 1864 presidential election. The 72-page piece coined the term miscegenation (from the Latin miscere "to mix" + genus "kind") and was put together by World managing editor David Goodman Croly and reporter George Wakeman.

The work purports to be a sincere advocacy of the virtues of racial mixing, but it is a literary forgery intended to prompt opposition to racial equality, and to blame the Lincoln administration for allegedly supporting this goal. The authors unsuccessfully attempted to trick Lincoln into endorsing the work. The World also featured a hoax about a "Miscegenation Ball" with interracial dancing alleged to have been held at a Republican function in New York City during the campaign.
