= Günther Hopfgartner =

Austrian politician

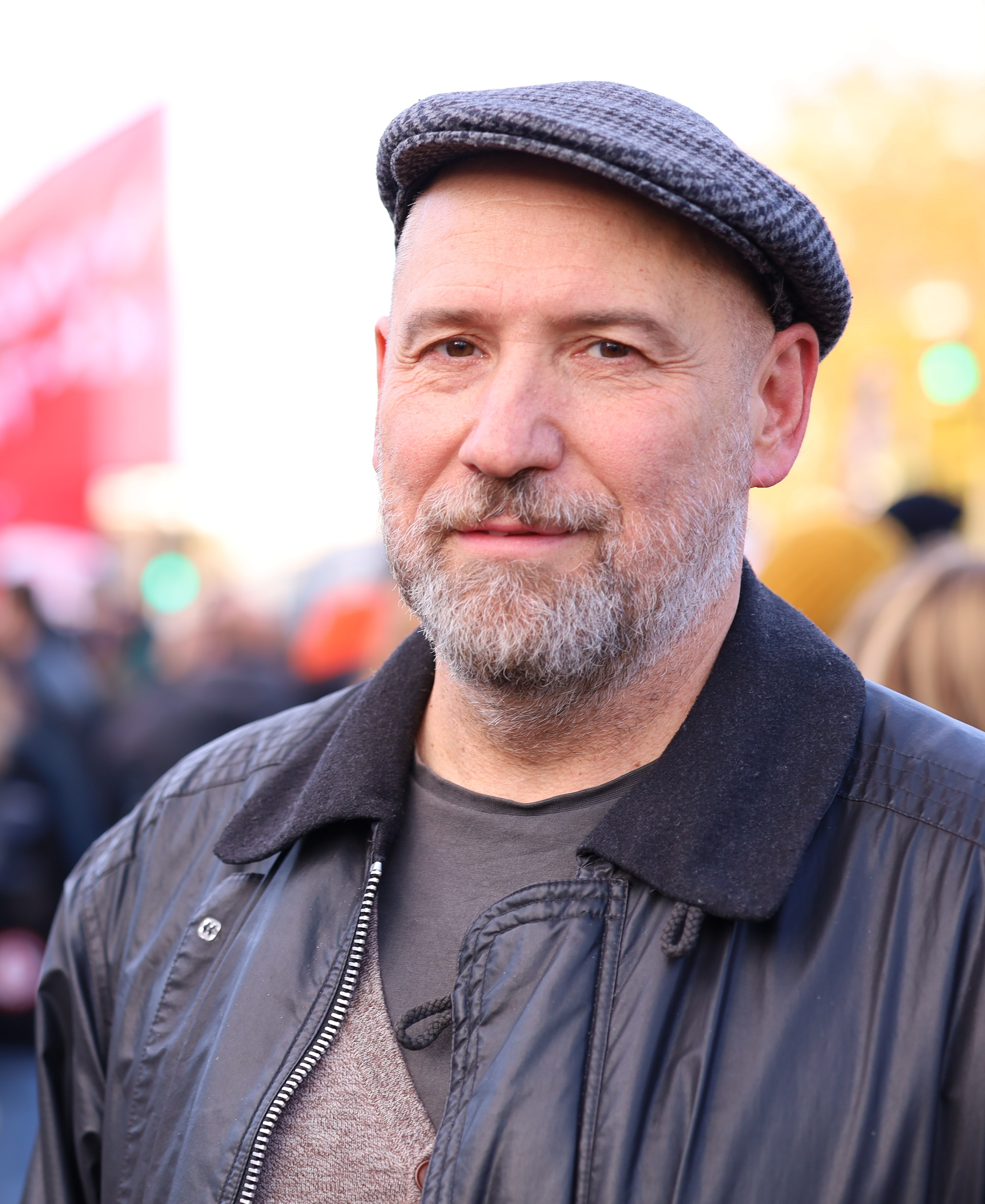
- Hopfgartner in 2021

Leader of the Communist Party of Austria
- Incumbent
- Assumed office June 2021
- Preceded by: Mirko Messner

Personal details
- Born: 12 August 1964 (age 61) Linz, Austria
- Party: Communist Party of Austria

Günther Hopfgartner (German pronunciation: [ˈɡʏntɐ ˈhɔpfɡaʁtnɐ]; born 12 August 1964) is an Austrian politician and former journalist, who's currently serving as the Leader of the Communist Party of Austria since June 2021.

One of the founders of the European Left Party and former Chairman of the Communist Youth of Austria, Hopfgartner is likely best known for his campaign during the 2024 European Parliament election.

== Biography ==
Günther Hopfgartner was born on 12 August 1964, in Linz. He presumably started his career as a lifeguard, in the years between 1986 and 1989.

At some point, Hopfgartner was the Chairman of the Communist Youth of Austria (KJÖ). It is known that he was a KJÖ official in the years 1989–1992. From there, until 2006, he was an editor for the Volksstimme newspaper. After that, until 2014, he was a managing director of a catering business.

From 2014 to 2023, Hopfgartner has held various positions, including leading ones, in different arts and culture-related institutions, including the Erbsenfabrik Laboratory for Art and Cultural Production.

Since 2004, he has continuously been a board member of the Communist Party of Austria. In 2004, he participated in the founding of the European Left Party. Between 2006 and 2012, he was also a board member of the party. Since 13 July 2017, Hopfgartner is the managing director of the Café 7*Stern in Vienna-Neubau.

In 2021, he was elected Chair of the Communist Party. Since December 2022, he has also been the Chairman of the Association for the Promotion of Social Criticism.

In January 2024, Hopfgartner was announced to be the primary candidate for the 2024 European Parliament election in Austria. The core issue of the campaign was affordable housing and the reflection of the "true issues" in the European Parliament. At a press release, Hopfgartner also advocated for the self-imposed salary cap, that was implemented on a federal level in Austria, to also be implemented in Brussels. The main campaign slogan of the party was "Housing instead of cannons" ("Wohnen statt Kanonen").

== Political views ==
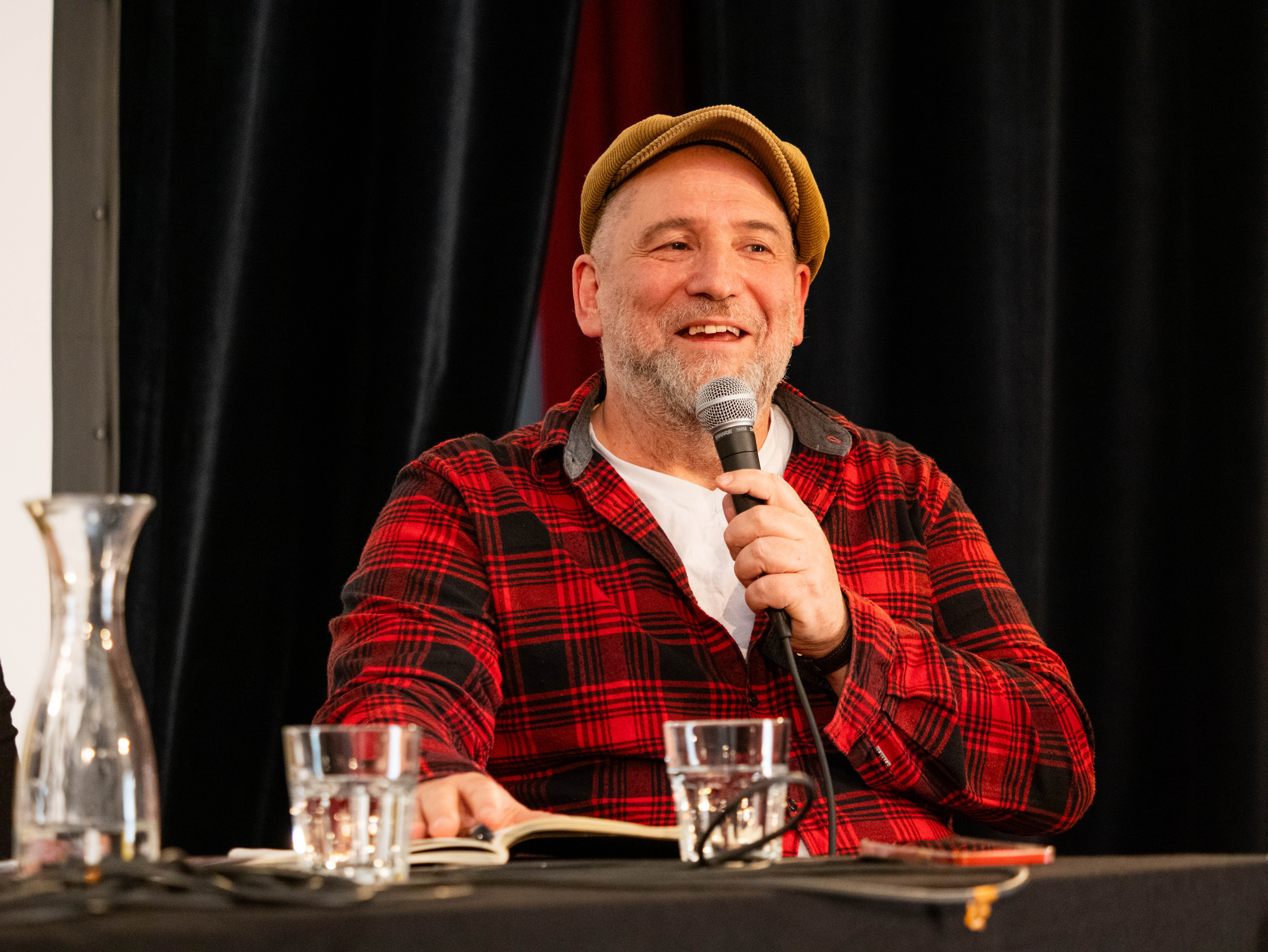
Hopfgartner at the 2024 Willi-Gaisch-Seminar in Graz

=== Internal affairs ===
Hopfgartner is a strong representative of the left and neutrality and a known critic of the impact of globalization and capitalism on the working class. During his electoral campaigns, he wanted to remove housing from competition law and create a European strategy for public housing that "meets the social and ecological requirements of our time". He insists that the salary cap for KPÖ politicians is made not higher than that of an average skilled worker.

=== Foreign policy ===
Regarding the Gaza war, Hopfgartner and his 2024 European Parliament campaign called for an immediate ceasefire in Israel and Palestine, demanding "a life free from violence!". Later that year, he'd call for the recognition of the State of Palestine and for the expansion of the support for Ukraine during the Russian invasion of Ukraine. He proposed that instead of supplying "excessive" armaments, Europe should invest in Ukrainian housing, write off its debt, etc. Hopfgartner sees two possible perspectives for the European Union: Either it moves towards a "community of solidarity", a social union, or it continues towards "militarism", in which the funds for social services, affordable housing or care will not be available.

== Personal life ==
Günther Hopfgartner is single.
