= Communist Student Association =

Organization at Austrian universities

Communist Student Association Kommunistischer Studierendenverband (KSV)
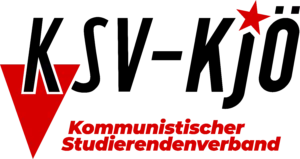
- Chairperson: Lukas Pflanzer
- Treasurer: Christopher Hirtler
- Founded: 1972
- Headquarters: Lagergasse 98a, 8020; Graz, Austria
- Website: ksv-kjö.at

The Communist Student Association (German: Kommunistischer Studierendenverband, KSV; also KSV-KJÖ) is a communist student organization at Austrian universities and a political faction within the Austrian Students' Association (ÖH). The KSV maintains a close relationship with the Communist Youth of Austria (KJÖ).

== History ==
The KSV was founded in 1972. Its predecessor organization was called the Association of Democratic Students (German: Vereinigung Demokratischer Studenten, VDS). On November 29, 1970, all Eurocommunist activists were expelled, and the organization was renamed Marxist-Leninist Students (MLS). On December 16, 1971, the "orthodox" supporters of the Communist Party of Austria (KPÖ) were expelled, who then founded the Group of Communist Students (GKS), which renamed itself KSV on October 14, 1972. In 2021, the KSV changed its name from "Kommunistischer StudentInnenverband" (Communist Students' Association) to "Kommunistischer Studierendenverband" (Communist Student Union).

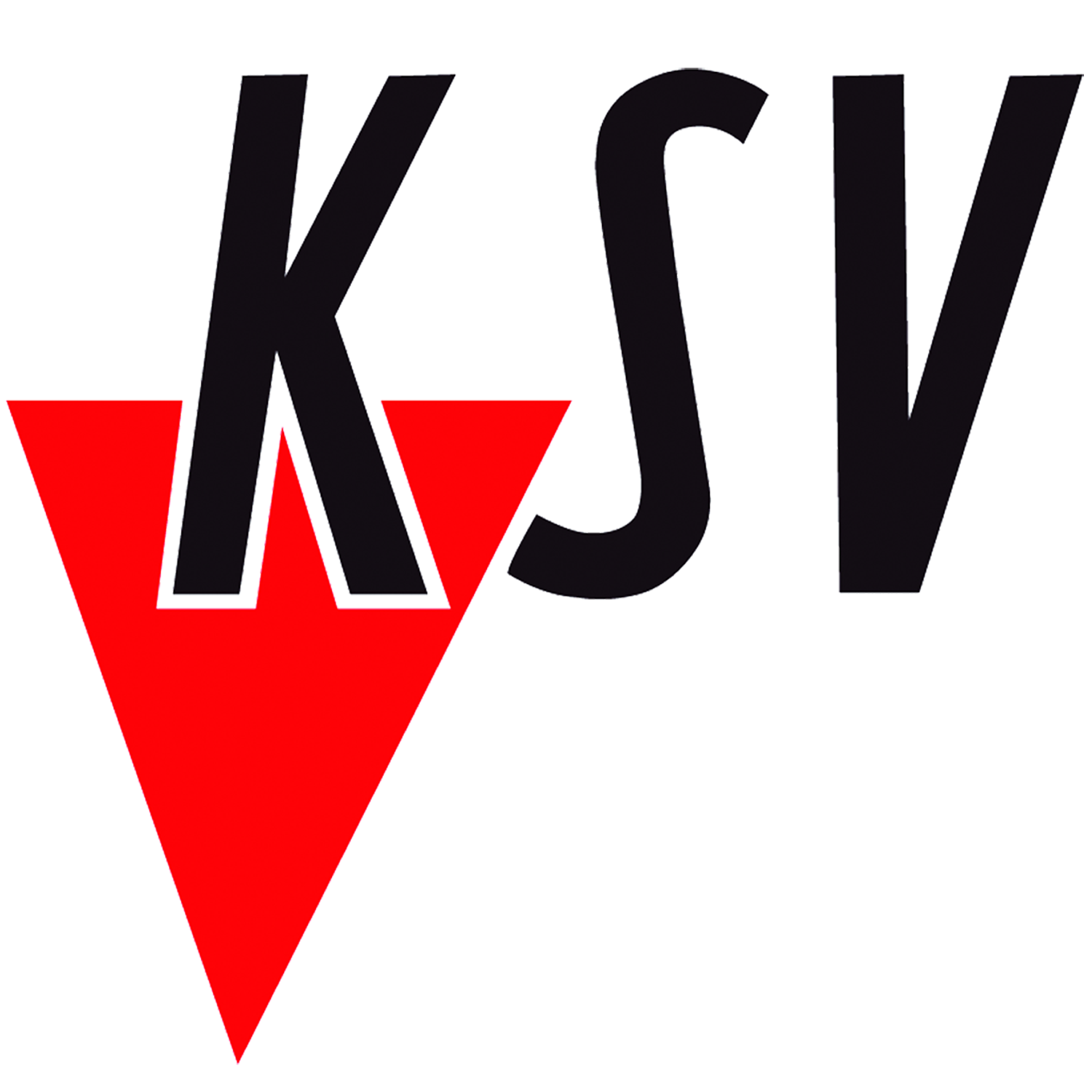
Standalone KSV logo

=== Splitting of the KSV ===
Before the Federal Congress in July 2006, the KSV split into two factions, both claiming the name KSV. In the lead-up to the Federal Congress, there were statutory disagreements between different factions within the KSV. A part of the Vienna KSV eventually boycotted the Congress and founded the Kommunistischer Student_innenverband – Linke Liste (KSV-LiLi).

In contrast to the KSV-LiLi, the board elected at the Federal Congress distanced itself several times from the course of the KPÖ federal board and was more closely aligned with KPÖ Styria and groups advocating a more traditional KPÖ course. While the KSV primarily relied on representatives, members, and activists from Styria, Linz, Vienna, Carinthia, and Salzburg, the KSV-LiLi was formed from former members and activists of the KSV Vienna.

In the student elections (ÖH-Election) of 2007, 2009, and 2011, the KSV ran at the University of Vienna as "Kommunistische Jugend Österreich StudentInnen – KJÖ", while the KSV-LiLi ran under the name "Kommunistischer StudentInnenverband – Linke Liste."

The KSV-LiLi has held a mandate in the university representation at the University of Vienna since 2007. In the ÖH elections of 2009 and 2011, a direct mandate was also won in the federal representation of the Austrian National Union of Students. Additionally, the KSV-LiLi has been part of the executive board of the ÖH at the University of Vienna since 2007.

KSV-KJÖ and KSV-Lili emphasize significant differences regarding their work in committees and global political views. In a 2011 interview, a KSV-Lili representative stated that they categorically distance themselves from "real socialism," while the KSV claims to maintain a nuanced view of the past. Furthermore, the KSV expresses solidarity with the Palestinian Liberation Organization (PLO), while the KSV-Lili defends Israel’s sovereignty. In the ÖH committees, the KSV claims that the KSV-Lili is merely a supporter of the left-wing majority, a claim that David Lang from KSV-Lili denies, asserting their influence in the ÖH at the University of Vienna.

KSV Membership Card (around 1990)

The KSV works closely with the KJÖ and the KPÖ Styria.

Key demands of the KSV include:

- The complete abolition of tuition fees
- The expansion of existing scholarship programs
- The establishment of comprehensive support services (in areas such as public transportation, housing, etc.) provided by the state
- The repeal of the University Act (UG 2002)
- The elimination of admission restrictions and increased budgets for universities.

In terms of education policy, the KSV traditionally advocates for open access to universities and defends the general political mandate of the ÖH. The KSV is highly critical of increased third-party funding of universities by private companies and banks, calling instead for greater state funding. The KSV opposes the Bologna Process and advocates for the reintroduction of diploma programs.

The KSV identifies as Marxist-Leninist and supports feminist and anti-racist positions.

== Election results ==
Since the 2005 ÖH elections, the KSV has consistently held one seat in the federal body of the ÖH.

In the 2007 ÖH election, following the split with KSV-LiLi, the KSV lost nearly half of its votes but managed to retain its seat.

In the 2017 ÖH elections, the KSV won 10.7% of the votes at Karl-Franzens-Universität, securing a second seat. Additionally, they gained one seat at both Graz University of Technology (6.5%) and the University College of Teacher Education Styria (11.8%).

For the first time in 2019, the KSV won a seat at FH Joanneum, with 15.4% of the vote. Nationally, with top candidate Dario Tabatabai, they gained 83 additional votes, while the KSV-LiLi lost 257 votes. Due to increased voter turnout, there was a slight proportional decline.

The COVID-19-related (partial) closures of universities in 2021 led to a drop in voter turnout to 15.7% (2019: 25.8%). Both the KSV-KJÖ and KSV-LiLi gained significantly, each securing two seats in the federal representation for the first time. KSV-KJÖ also won a seat at the University of Vienna for the first time, while KSV-LiLi increased its seats to three. In Graz, with top candidate Bianca Gröbner, the KSV entered the student representation at the University of Music and Performing Arts Graz. They also regained a seat at Graz University of Technology and a second seat at the University of Graz, reflecting national growth.

With top candidate Lukas Pflanzer, not only did KSV retain its second seat but also gained 1,174 additional votes (+ 0.71%). The mayor of Graz, Elke Kahr, chairwoman of the KPÖ Graz, congratulated them on this "historic success". The KSV also won seats at the University of Salzburg and FH Campus Vienna.

== Work in committees ==
In 2018, a controversy at the University of Graz arose concerning the purchase of a Nespresso coffee machine by the ÖH executive team. The purchase, initiated by members of the Unabhängige Fachschaftslisten, VSStÖ, and GRAS, was not disclosed to either the university's student representatives or the financial committee. Georg Erkinger, the chair of the financial committee from the KSV, heavily criticized the acquisition, estimating that the total cost over 10 years would exceed €40,000. As the situation gained attention in both media and social networks, the pressure led to the resignation of ÖH Chairman Bernhard Wieser, who was involved in the undisclosed purchase alongside Finance Officer Amar Menkovic. This incident highlighted tensions within the ÖH regarding transparency and financial oversight.

== Publications ==
At irregular intervals, the magazine Unitat is published as a periodical of the Bundes-KSV. Additionally, KSV Graz publishes two issues per semester of the magazine rotcrowd.

== Notable former activists of the KSV ==
- Walter Baier (*1954), Austrian politician
- Klaus Eberhartinger (*1950), Austrian singer
- Robert Krotzer (*1987), Austrian politician
- Klaus Luger (*1960), Austrian politician
- Kurt Palm (*1955), Austrian director and author
- Josef Ehmer (1948–2023), Austrian historian
- Andreas Peham (*1967), Austrian researcher on right-wing extremism and anti-Semitism
