= Mirko Messner =

Austrian communist politician

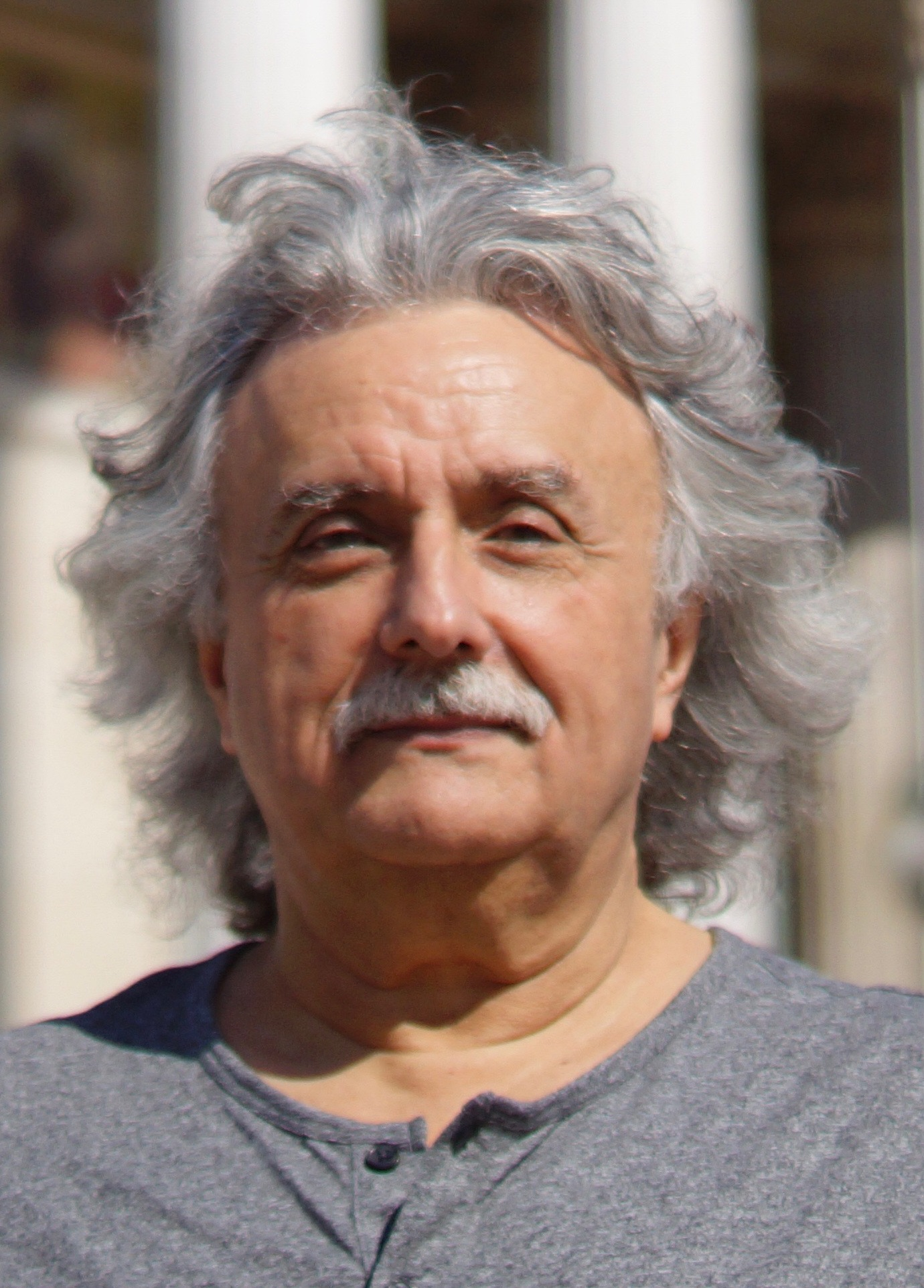
- Messner in 2017

Chair of the Communist Party of Austria
- In office March 2006 – June 2021 Co-leading with Melina Klaus (2006–2012)
- Preceded by: Walter Baier
- Succeeded by: Günther Hopfgartner

Personal details
- Born: Štefan Miroslav Messner; 16 December 1948 (age 77) Slovenj Gradec, PR Slovenia, Yugoslavia
- Party: Communist (KPÖ)
- Education: University of Vienna

Štefan Miroslav "Mirko" Messner (born 16 December 1948) is an Austrian, Carinthian Slovene slavicist and communist politician, who led the Communist Party of Austria (KPÖ) from February 2006 to June 2021.

== Life ==
After graduating from high school, Messner studied Slavic studies and German studies at the University of Vienna, where he received his doctorate in 1977.

As a teenager, he was politically active in the Verband Sozialistischer Mittelschüler (Association of Socialist Middle Schoolers) in Carinthia. After its dissolution in 1973, Messner joined the KPÖ-led Communist Student Union within the Austrian Students' Association. During his studies he became involved in the Slovene Students' Association (Koroška dijaška zveza) and created the Slovenian student newspaper Kladivo, which was published until 1989. When he could not assert his view of nationality policy on the question of Slovenian minority in the party, Messner resigned from all party offices, including membership of the central committee, and quit his job as an employee of the party in 1987.

After the KPÖ held the Grazer Erneuerungsparteitag (Party Congress for Renewal in Graz) in 2005, Messner was initially active in the reconstitution of the KPÖ in Klagenfurt and was finally elected as the party's minority spokesman and a member of its federal executive board in February 2006. In March of the same year, Messner was also elected Federal Spokesperson for the party together with Melina Klaus. Messner has been the leading candidate for his party in all four Austrian National Council elections since 2006.

From 2009 to 2016 he was also editor of the party newspaper Volksstimme, which appears as a monthly magazine. Messner was the sole federal spokesman for the KPÖ from 2012 to 2021.
