= Tobias Schweiger =

Austrian politician

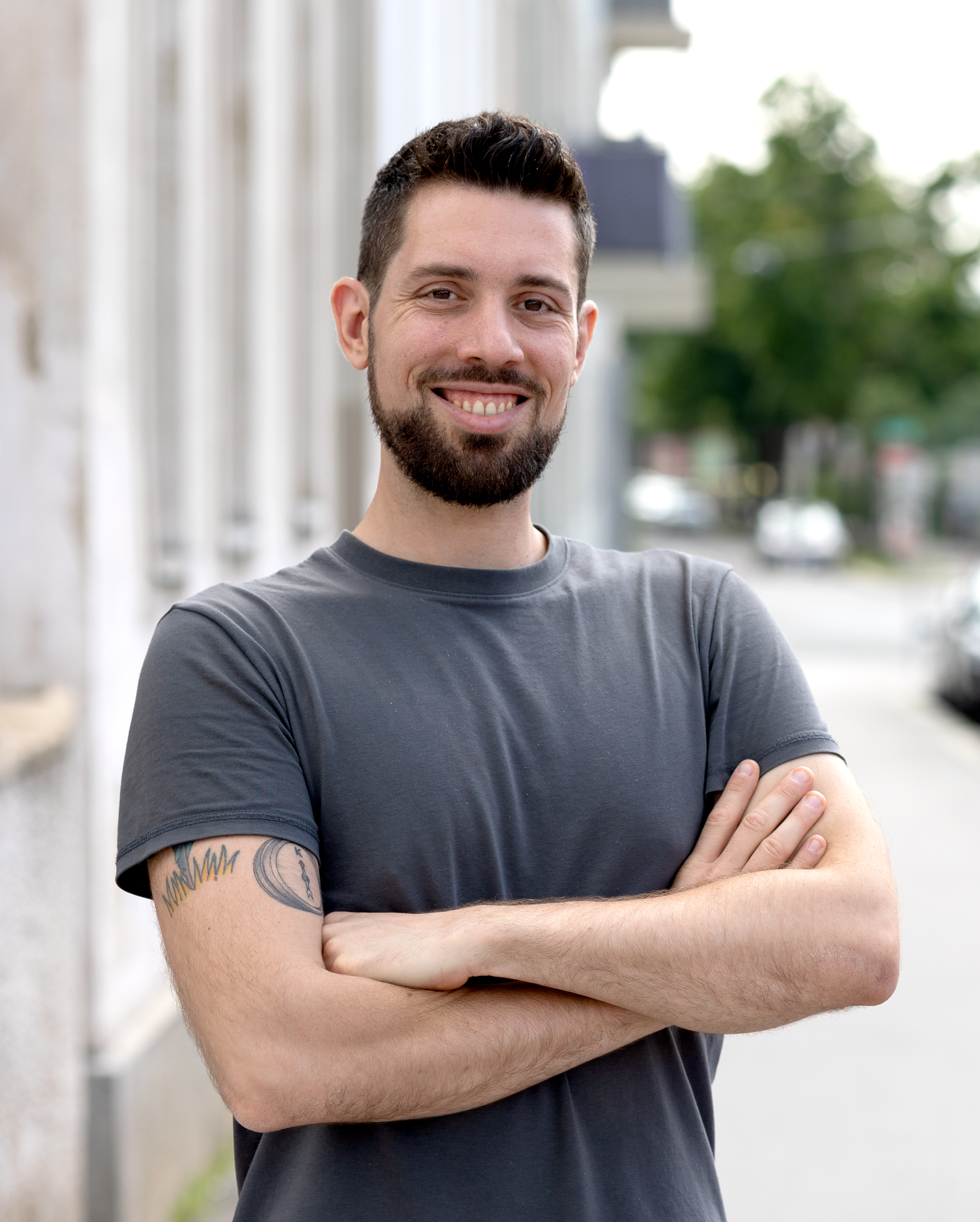
- Schweiger in 2023

Personal details
- Born: 3 May 1990 (age 36) Graz, Austria
- Party: Communist Party of Austria
- Other party: The Greens
- Education: University of Graz; University of Bremen; University of Vienna

Tobias Schweiger (born 3 May 1990, in Graz, Austria) is an Austrian politician of the Communist Party of Austria. Schweiger has served as his party's national spokesperson since 20 June 2021.

== Biography ==
Tobias Schweiger was born in Graz in 1990 and attended the Wirtschaftskundliches Bundesrealgymnasium. After graduating from high school in 2008, he first studied economics at the Karl-Franzens University of Graz and then, starting in 2012, at the University of Bremen, where he earned a Bachelor's degree in Philosophy and Political Science. After returning to Austria in 2017, he began studying a Master's international development and socioeconomics at the University of Vienna.

A native of Graz, he became politically active at an early age. Among other things, he was active in the Graz squatter scene and, in 2010, founded the Young Greens as the nationwide youth organization of The Greens, serving as its national spokesperson for a time. At the same time, he repeatedly criticized The Greens for what he viewed as its “undemocratic development” or its support for neoliberal reforms.

Following the split between the parent party and the Young Greens, Schweiger ran as a candidate for the new alliance between the Green youth organization and the KPÖ in the 2017 Austrian legislative election. In 2019, he succeeded Flora Petrik as national spokesperson for the Young Left, which had been founded in 2018 following the Young Greens’ expulsion from the party. There, he advocated, among other things, for a public housing initiative and the establishment of a free tutoring network. In his role as federal spokesperson for the Young Left, he also criticized the KPÖ for failing to fulfill this responsibility. Nevertheless, in 2021, Schweiger moved from the Young Left to the leadership of the KPÖ.

Schweiger became the KPÖ’s lead candidate for the 2024 Austrian legislative election. In October 2025, he was elected sole federal spokesperson for the KPÖ, having previously been part of a six-member team of federal spokespersons.

== Political positions ==
Schweiger is regarded as the ideological mastermind of the Young Left, whose positions he has repeatedly championed publicly. Unlike the established parties, he argues, a communist party must follow the path of building a grassroots base at the local level and engage in the long process of left-wing organizing. As part of a six-member team that replaced Mirko Messner at the party’s helm, he is primarily responsible for campaign organization. In his inaugural statement, he declared that, for him, communist politics means “being courageous and working together to revive class politics from the bottom up.” His commitment ranges from campaigning against the demolition of skateparks to activities against right-wing extremism and actions against rising social inequality. Schweiger states his guiding principle as follows: “We need a political party that honestly promises what it can deliver after the election. A party that creates opportunities for people to get involved and encourages them to take action themselves.”

Following the KPÖ’s electoral success in Graz on 26 September 2021, under the leadership of Elke Kahr, Tobias Schweiger became known to a wider public as the party’s national spokesperson.
