= Gisela Tschofenig =

Austrian political and resistance activist

- Born: Gisela Taurer; 21 May 1917; Landskron (Villach), Carinthia (Cisleithania), Austria
- Died: 27 April 1945 (aged 27); Schörgenhub labour camp, Linz, Reichsgau Oberdonau, Germany
- Occupations: Railway clerk/cashier Underground political activist Resistance activist
- Political party: KPÖ
- Spouse: Josef "Pepe" Tschofenig
- Children: Hermann Tschofenig
- Parent(s): Karl & Helene Taurer

Gisela Tschofenig (born Gisela Taurer:21 May 1917 - 27 April 1945) was an (illegal) Austrian Communist political activist who after 1938 became an anti-government resistance activist. In 1945 fellow detainees at the Schörgenhub labour camp, who had heard overnight shots on 27/28 April, after seeing Tschofenig called outside with two other women, had their fears confirmed the following morning when one of the camp guards was seen to be wearing their friend's "mountain boots".

== Life and death ==
Gisela Taurer was born into a railway family in Carinthia. She had two elder brothers and, after 1919, one younger sister. Gisela grew up with her family, initially, at Landskron, a little town just outside Villach. In 1925 the family relocated to Villach. In 1935 they had to relocate again, this time in connection with her father's work. Locomotive Driver Karl Taurer was transferred to the locomotive depot at Linz, having been assessed as "politically unreliable" in Villach. His daughter was also politically aware, even as a young child, participating actively in Social Democratic youth organisations such as Österreichische Kinderfreunde and die Rote Falken. The early 1930s were a period of intensifying polarisation across western and central Europe: in 1932 she switched her political allegiance to the Young Communists. It was during her three years with the Young Communists that Gisela Taurer first met Josef "Pepe" Tschofenig, whom she later married. In 1933 she was just 16, still living with her parents in Villach, when she had her first significant unfriendly encounter with the police, when she was found handing out political leaflets in behalf of the Young Communists. (Chancellor Dollfuss had choreographed the "Self-elimination of the Austrian Parliament", clearing the way for five years of what came to be known as "Austrofascism" a few weeks earlier.)

Gisela Taurer received a solid school level and higher education, the final three years of which involved three years at the "Höhere Lehranstalt für wirtschaftliche Frauenberufe" (loosely, "Higher education College for Women in Business") in Villach. In April 1937 she quit her office job with the BBÖ (Austrian Railways operator) in Linz, and set off for Spain with her friend Margarethe Gröblinger, intending to participate on the government side in the Spanish Civil War. As matters turned out the girls never got beyond the south of France, however. They stopped off in Lyon where Taurer and her friend both took jobs as governesses, "au pairs" or nanny. (All three terms are used in sources.) The remained in Lyon for a year, at the end of which Gisela Taurer had mastered the French language. The Spanish war was going badly, however, from the perspective of the Spanish government: the "nationalists" were winning, and in April 1938 she returned home to Linz, where she resumed her employment with the railways, now working as a cashier at the main station (Hbf).

She also resumed her "party work", authoring and publishing political leaflets and organising courier operations. She became well known among fellow-members of the movement. Left-wing political parties had been effectively outlawed in Austria since as far back as 1934, but the imposition and enforcement of one-party dictatorship had been enforced by the government with greatly intensified rigour and deadliness since the integration of Austria into a newly enlarged version of Germany in 1938. Underground political movements could be and were penetrated by security service spies, which encouraged a cellular organisational structure. That in turn increased the need for "couriers" to coordinate the political and resistance work of the different communist cells. That Gisela Taurer's political activism was known about among comrades placed her in significant danger.

The friendship with Josef Tschofenig, by this time described as a "party official in the illegal Communist Party", had grown warmer. Tschofenig was a proud self-proclaimed antifascist, however, whose record of political activism stretched at least as far back as 1933, when he experienced the first of several terms of imprisonment in connection with his political activism. Soon after the "Anschluss" (identified by some as the German invasion) in March 1938 he escaped to Czechoslovakia where during the Autumn/Fall of 1938 he was again imprisoned. Details concerning his movements during the next nine months are sketchy, but by the summer of 1939 he had found refuge in Belgium, where he was joined by Gisela, his political soulmate and childhood sweetheart, in July 1939. According to one source Tschofenig received his military conscription notification in the Autumn/Fall of 1939, but he evidently ignored it. According to various sources Gisela Taurer and Josef Tschofenig lived together in a form or political exile in Berchem, an outer district on the south side of Antwerp, for approximately ten months. During May 1940 the German army undertook and completed a rapid invasion of Belgium, so could no longer be ignored, however. Josef Tschofenig was promptly arrested and transferred to the vast internment camp at Saint-Cyprien in southern France. In or before December 1940 he was transferred again, this time to the Dachau concentration camp.

Gisela, now alone and pregnant, found a legal way to return home to Linz where her parents were still living. On reaching home she made contact with the resistance group around Josef Teufl, who was viewed as the regional head of the (still illegal) party. Her "political activities" are thought to have included, as they had before her ten months in Belgium, acting as a point of contact between relatively isolated activist cells, arranging courier services for them, and authoring political leaflets. She was also able to use the language skills acquired during her time as an au pair in France to establish and sustain contact with the French forced labourers at the "Reichswerke AG für Erzbergbau und Eisenhütten „Hermann Göring“" (iron works) in Linz, which during the erarly 1940s became a beacon for the National Socialist military-industrial complex. Intense secrecy was vital. Although Giesla Taurer and her friend Theresia Reindl were in close contact during this period, neither was made aware of the other's "underground activities".

Hermann Tschofenig, Gisela's son by her partnership with Josef Tschofenig, was born on 21 December 1940. Sources are for the most part silent about her activities during the ensuing three years, beyond noting that she tried, without success, to secure the release of Josef Tschofenig from the Dachau concentration camp to which he had been transferred at arouhnd the same time as the child was born. There are indications that after Gisela left Linz in 1944, the child stayed behind with family members - most likely Gisela's parents and/or her younger sister.

On 3 June 1944 Gisela Taurer finally married Josef Tschofenig at the Standesamt (loosely, "registry office") which had been set up at the Dachau concentration camp. Three days later, on 6 June 1944, the district court in Linz retrospectively conferred "legal legitimacy" on the infant Hermann Tschofenig. Gisela's repeated efforts to secure her husband's release were still without success, however. In July 1944 Gisela Tschofenig, hoping to improve her husband's chances of release, let it be known that she had abandoned her political activism in Linz and fled, now with her four-year-old son, back to Carinthia. Several sources explain the move with the explanation that Linz had become "too hot" for her. She took a room in the home of the Tatschl family near Villach. (According to at least one source she had a negative premonition about moving in with the Tatschls, but she nevertheless made the move.)

Tschofenig was arrested on suspicion of "subversive political activity" ("... staatsfeindlicher politischer Betätigung ") by the security services at the Tatschls' home on 25 September 1944 and taken back to Linz. The arrest came in the context of a wider sweep by the security services, targeting the "Communist Resistance". According to one source, before reaching Linz she stopped off at the Mauthausen concentration camp where she underwent a routine "interrogation" during the course of which she was informed that she would never see her son again.

At Linz she was delivered to the women's prison in Linz-Kaplanhof, where she was held, apparently without any trial, for slightly more than six months. During the night of 30/31 March 1945 the prison suffered a serious bomb attack in which eight women were killed and four more badly injured. Tschofenig survived, however, and was among those who were able to make their way out from under the burning rubble. The survivors were recaptured, however, and in the evening driven across town to the labour camp at Schörgenhub. Despite its designated purpose, it seems that by this time Schörgenhub was being used primarily as a place of detention for political detainees. The accommodation block in which the Kaplanhof were accommodated is described as "half-finished". Tschofenig evidently did not expect to get out alive. She tried to arrange for her mother and child to visit her, and did indeed get to see them both one more time, but only through the camp's perimeter fence. During the night of 27 April 1945 Gisela Tschofenig, Risa Höllermann from Wels and a third woman whose name remains unknown were ordered outside with their blankets. All three were shot dead, apparently beside a pit. There were also three men shot dead at the same time. Just six days later, on 3 May 1945, the camp was liberated by American troops.

The camp guards and administrators had fled ahead of the advancing forces. If Gisela Tschofenig's name had ever been included in any "death list", the list had been destroyed. Nevertheless, one of her friend Theresia Reindl (for whom a pit had already been dug, but who was nevertheless still alive a few days later when the camp was liberated) was able to indicate the location of the pit in which Tschofenig's body had been placed, along with those of the other five killed at the same time. Ten days after the camp was liberated, Karl Taurer undertook the grisly task of exhuming the six bodies in the pit. According to sources he was helped by "some railway worker Nazis". Newspaper reports of the time identify the three men whose bodies were exhumed from the pit containing Tschofenig's earthly remains as "a farmer called Franz Popp, from Molln", "a man called Stadler from Gmunden" and "an unknown Jew". (Other burial pits had already, by this point, been opened up and cleared of their grim contents.)

On 15 May 1945 Gisela Tschofenig's body was reburied nearby at the Kleinmünchen Cemetery, on the southern edge of the city. A shocking report of the affair from his maternal grandmother was retained by Hermann Tschofenig, although as late as 1953 Gisela Tschofenig's death still had not been officially registered, due to the absence of the correct documentation.

== Celebration ==
The "Tschofenigweg", a little street in Linz-Ebelsberg was named after Gisela Tschofenig in 2006.
