= Young Left =

Young Left may refer to one of the following political movements.

- Young Left (Austria)
- Young Left (Sweden)
- Young Left (Norway)
- Young Left (Italy)
- Young Left (Lithuania)
