= Free Austrian Youth =

Austrian left-wing youth organization

The Free Austrian Youth (German: Freie Österreichische Jugend, abbreviated FÖJ) was a youth organization in Austria, emerging after World War II. Whilst nominally an all-party youth organisation, FÖJ was closely associated with the Communist Party of Austria. The organisation was a member of the World Federation of Democratic Youth (WFDY). After a rupture between FÖJ and the Communist Party in 1969, a faction of FÖJ continues to exist as 'FÖJ – Movement for Socialism' (German: FÖJ – Bewegung für Sozialismus).

== Post-war emergence ==
FÖJ was founded in 1945. It was the first new youth organisation to emerge in Austria at the end of World War II. It was intended as a broad, all-party youth organisation. It styled itself as an independent, anti-fascist and democratic youth organisation. The organisation gathered socialist, communist and Catholic youth among its ranks. The organisation was sponsored by the communist Minister of Education Ernst Fischer. The organisation published the weekly Jugend Voran ('Youth Forward').

The organisation had its predecessors among anti-fascist exile groups. There was a continuity from the London-based Austrian Centre from the war years. The name Jugend Voran had been the title of the magazine of the Austrian World Youth Movement in British exile. Georg Beuer, the former editor of Young Austria and Jung-Osterreich in London, became editor the Jugend Voran weekly.

FÖJ emerged as one of the most important political youth organisations in the Second Republic. FÖJ was actively involved in post-war reconstruction work, engaging in rebuilding enterprises damaged in the war and organising transport. In line with directives from the Communist Party, mass cultural work was prioritized and FÖJ and KPÖ set up tens of choirs, amateur theatre troupes and instrumental ensembles. As of 1945 Franz Danimann was the chairman of FÖJ.

FÖJ held a conference in Vienna January 12–13, 1946, with delegates from all parts of the country. The conference called on democratic young Austrians to rebuild country, called for support to the World Federation of Democratic Youth (WFDY) and called on United Nations youth organisations to attend first national FÖJ congress to be held May 1946. The first FÖJ congress opened in Vienna on June 21, 1946. It was attended by the Minister of Education Felix Hurdes (ÖVP) and Minister of Education Karl Altmann (KPÖ). There were fraternal delegates from Czechoslovakia, Poland and Bulgaria, whilst delegates from the Soviet Union, Yugoslavia and Hungary had not managed to arrive in Vienna.

In the aftermath of the 1945 Austrian legislative election (which had been a disappointment for the KPÖ), FÖJ moved closer to a more explicit communist line. In response to the growing influence of leftist and communist forces within FÖJ, the Austrian People's Party and the Social Democratic Party of Austria engineering splits in the organisation and setting up their own youth organisations as rival entities. The Executive Committee of the Social Democratic Party banned party members from joining FÖJ.

== Onset of Cold War ==
FÖJ came to function as the organisation of communist youths in Austria. FÖJ were in the forefront of the emerging peace movement in the country, and called for the speedy conclusion of the Austrian State Treaty. The organisation had its central office at Prinz-Eugen-Straße in the fourth district of Vienna.

During 1951–1952 the FÖJ membership grew from some 6,700 to 14,700. Most of the members came from the Soviet occupation zone, where the organisation had over 10,000 members. During this period various mass events were organised, such as youth manifestations in Linz and Graz, summer camps and sports festivals.

The fifth FÖJ congress was held in Vienna on December 7–8, 1954. 320 delegates from local branches participated in the congress, as well as guests from foreign organisations and representatives of other Austrian organisations. The congress debated and adopted the 'Principles of Activity of the Free Austrian Youth', which called for the construction of a socialist society in Austria - in particular through educational reform.

Jugend Voran became a monthly publication.

The eight FÖJ congress was held in May 1967, at which a new program was adopted. The new program outlined that FÖJ would work for the education of youth in an anti-fascist, democratic spirit. The FÖJ program called for the prohibition of organizations and publications that conduct fascist or neo-Nazi propaganda or oppose the recognition of Austrian nationhood. The organisation demanded suffrage rights at the age of 18, democratization of the army, the reduction of the period of military service, the adoption of laws for 40-hour work week for apprentices, young workers and employees, the improvement of vocational education, equal pay for equal work, the equalization of social rights of young agricultural workers with other working youth, compulsory school education until the age of 15 years, and the expansion of the network of higher education institutions. FÖJ advocated a policy of state neutrality for Austria, and opposed plans for Austria joining the European Common Market and NATO, opposed the US war in Vietnam and called for the prohibition of nuclear weapons.

The highest organ of the organisation was the congress, held at least every four years. Delegates would be elected from local or district branches. Decisions at the congress would be taken by simple majority vote, except for changes to the charter of the organisation which require a two-thirds majority. The statues of the organisation outlined that between congresses the organisation was led by a board elected by the congress. The board would elected from among its members a secretariat and chairman. Membership was open to people aged 14 to 25 years, albeit persons older than 25 years could be members of the organisation if they held leadership positions. FÖJ was a member of WFDY. By 1968 the FÖJ magazine had been renamed Jugend-68.

== Rupture with the Communist Party ==
Unlike the mother party KPÖ, the FÖJ vigorously condemned the Soviet intervention in Czechoslovakia in 1968. The split on the Czechoslovakia question led to a rupture between the youth organisation and the mother party. As of 1969 FÖJ had an estimated 5,000 members. In the evening of October 28, 1969, the KPÖ announced that FÖJ had been dissolved. The magazine Jugend-69 would no longer be printed at the party printing house. The decision had been taken at a plenum of the KPÖ Central Committee by a vote of 45 to 25. The declaration called for the formation of a new KPÖ youth movement.

The new KPÖ youth wing, the Communist Youth of Austria (KJÖ), was formed by FÖJ activists at a founding congress in Vienna May 9–10, 1970. The KJÖ chairman Otto Podolsky rejected the independent line of the predecessor organisation FÖJ. Many FÖJ members rejected the formation of KJÖ, and kept operating as an independent organisation.

After the rupture with KPÖ, the remnants of FÖJ functioned as an independent New Left dissident movement. The remnants of FÖJ took the name 'FÖJ-Movement for Socialism' (German: FÖJ–Bewegung für Sozialismus). It produced a monthly magazine called Offensiv links. The group took part in the 1971 Austrian legislative election in Vienna only, running under the name Offensiv links and obtained 1,874 votes. As of the early 1980s the group had some 200–300 supporters.

== Archives ==
In late 2013, the board of FÖJ-Movement for Socialism decided to transfer its archive to the Ludwig Boltzmann Institute for History and Society (LBIGG) for research and analysis. The written records of the FÖJ archive comprise some 15 linear metres (49 ft), including meeting minutes, correspondence, discussion and resolution texts, organizational reports and collections of materials from public campaigns. The archive also includes photos, magazines, newsletters, posters, flags and commemorative pins. The FÖJ archive was digitalized through financial support from the Future Fund of the Republic of Austria and the National Fund of the Republic of Austria.
