= United Cyprus Party =

United Cyprus Party Birleşik Kıbrıs Partisi
- Leader: İzzet İzcan
- General Secretary: Salih Sonüstün
- Founded: 2003
- Split from: New Cyprus Party
- Headquarters: North Nicosia, Northern Cyprus
- Ideology: Socialism; Cyprus reunification Cypriotism
- Political position: Left-wing
- European affiliation: Party of the European Left
- Colours: Red, blue and white
- Parliament: 0 / 50

Website
- www.birlesikkibris.com

The United Cyprus Party (Turkish: Birleşik Kıbrıs Partisi, BKP) is a left-wing, socialist party in Northern Cyprus. The party was founded in 2003 by İzzet İzcan. It supports the idea of a free, demilitarised and united Cyprus. In the 2009 elections, the BKP won 34,239 votes (2.42%) and no seats. In the 2013 elections it won 39,127 votes (3.15%) and no seats.

== Election results ==
Assembly of The Republic
Choice	Vote			Chair		Result
Choice	#	%	Rank	#	±	Result
2009	34.239	2.4	6th	0 / 50	New	—
2013	39,127	3.15	5th	0 / 50	0	—
2018	143,645	2.68	7th	0 / 50	0	—
