= Kladivo =

Austrian political magazine

- Categories: Political magazine
- Frequency: Monthly
- First issue: 1970
- Final issue: 1989
- Country: Austria
- Based in: Klagenfurt
- Language: German; Slovene

Kladivo (meaning Hammer in English) was a Slovene and German language cultural-political magazine published from Klagenfurt, Austria, from 1970 to 1989.

== History and profile ==
Kladivo was founded by a group of Slovene student activists in 1970. The magazine was published by the Association of Friends of Kladivo (Verein der Freunde des Kladivo). It was a monthly, but publication was sometimes irregular.

Initially Kladivo had an anti-authoritarian socialist, but developed into a platform for Slovene intellectuals sympathizing with the Communist Party of Austria. As of 1980, Janko Malle was the editor-in-chief of the magazine.
