= 1971 Austrian legislative election =

- 10 October 1971

All 183 seats in the National Council 92 seats needed for a majority
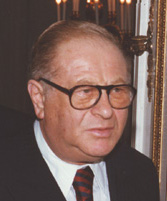

| | First party | Second party | Third party |
|---|---|---|---|
| Leader | Bruno Kreisky | Hermann Withalm | Friedrich Peter |
| Party | SPÖ | ÖVP | FPÖ |
| Last election | 48.42%, 81 seats | 44.69%, 78 seats | 5.52%, 6 seats |
| Seats won | 93 | 80 | 10 |
| Seat change | ▲12 | ▲2 | ▲4 |
| Popular vote | 2,280,168 | 1,964,713 | 286,473 |
| Percentage | 50.04% | 43.11% | 6.29% |
| Swing | ▲1.62 pp | ▼1.58 pp | ▲0.77 pp |
Chancellor before election
Bruno Kreisky
SPÖ
Elected Chancellor
Bruno Kreisky
SPÖ

Early parliamentary elections were held in Austria on 10 October 1971, following electoral reforms intended to benefit smaller parties. The size of the National Council was increased from 165 to 183 members, and the proportionality of the seat distribution was increased as well.

The Socialist Party, which had governed in minority since 1970, won 93 of the 183 seats, a majority of three. Voter turnout was 92%. It was the first time that the Socialists had won an absolute majority at an election. They also won just over half of the vote, something no Austrian party had previously achieved in a free election. Socialist leader Bruno Kreisky continued as Chancellor.

== Results ==
| Party | Votes | % | Seats | +/– |
|---|---|---|---|---|
| Socialist Party of Austria | 2,280,168 | 50.04 | 93 | +12 |
| Austrian People's Party | 1,964,713 | 43.11 | 80 | +2 |
| Freedom Party of Austria | 248,473 | 5.45 | 10 | +4 |
| Communist Party of Austria | 61,762 | 1.36 | 0 | 0 |
| Offensive Left | 1,874 | 0.04 | 0 | New |
| Total | 4,556,990 | 100.00 | 183 | +18 |
| Valid votes | 4,556,990 | 98.90 | | |
| Invalid/blank votes | 50,626 | 1.10 | | |
| Total votes | 4,607,616 | 100.00 | | |
| Registered voters/turnout | 4,984,448 | 92.44 | | |
Source: Nohlen & Stöver

=== Results by state ===
| State | SPÖ | ÖVP | FPÖ | KPÖ | ÖL |
|---|---|---|---|---|---|
| Burgenland | 50.2 | 46.4 | 2.9 | 0.5 | - |
| Carinthia | 55.0 | 33.8 | 9.7 | 1.6 | - |
| Lower Austria | 47.0 | 48.6 | 3.1 | 1.2 | - |
| Upper Austria | 48.0 | 44.7 | 6.5 | 0.8 | - |
| Salzburg | 45.2 | 42.5 | 11.5 | 0.8 | - |
| Styria | 49.0 | 44.5 | 4.9 | 1.6 | - |
| Tyrol | 37.8 | 56.5 | 5.2 | 0.6 | - |
| Vorarlberg | 36.6 | 51.6 | 11.1 | 0.7 | - |
| Vienna | 59.5 | 33.9 | 4.3 | 2.1 | 0.2 |
| Austria | 50.0 | 43.1 | 5.5 | 1.4 | 0.0 |
Source: Institute for Social Research and Consulting (SORA)
