= University College of Teacher Education Styria =

Education organization in Graz, Austria

- Pädagogische Hochschule Steiermark
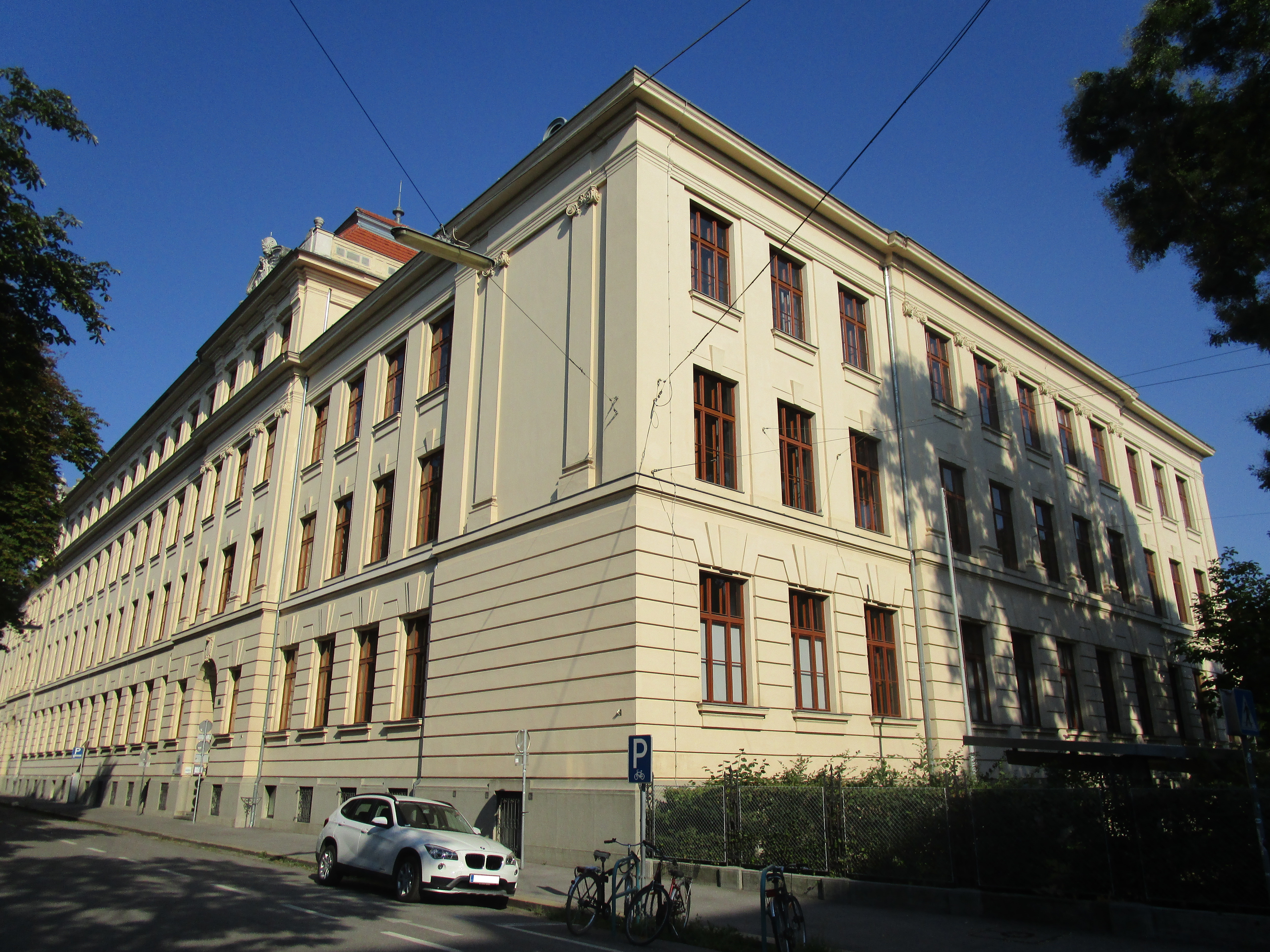
- Type: Public
- Established: 2007
- Affiliations: Non-denominational
- Rector: Elgrid Messner, since 2012
- Academic staff: 400
- Students: 2,700
- Location: Graz, Styria, Austria; 47°04′41″N 15°26′57″E
- Campus: Urban
- Website: www.phst.at/home

The University College of Teacher Education Styria (German: Pädagogische Hochschule Steiermark) is a teacher training university in Graz, Austria awarding undergraduate and master's degrees. It also operates continuing education programs.

== Status ==
The University College of Teacher Education Styria is an Austrian educational and research institution in the tertiary sector. It specialises in teacher education degrees and programs, and research into the development and improvement of the education system. It trains primary and secondary teachers and vocational teachers. There are also continuing courses for practicing teachers.

== Background ==
The oldest component college was the former Teachers' Educational Institute dating from 1870, and was located at Burggasse 13 in Graz. It relocated to the current main building on Hasnerplatz in Graz-Geidorf and was reopened in 1909 by the governor of Styria, Manfred von Clary and Aldringen (1852-1928), in the presence of Governor Edmund von Attems-Heiligenkreuz (1847-1929) and the mayor of the city of Graz, Franz Graf (1837-1921).

The Teacher Education Act (Hochschulgesetz, HG) of 2005 established 9 public university colleges of teacher education (Pädagogische Hochschule) in place of the post-secondary colleges for teacher training (Akademien für Lehrerinnen- und Lehrerbildung). University colleges of teacher education operate teacher training programmes (Lehramtsstudien) as bachelor's and master's degree programmes as well as further-education programmes (weiterbildende Lehrgänge). The University College was founded on 1 October 2007 from a merger of the Federal Education Academy in Styria, the Graz Vocational Education Academy and the Pedagogical Institute Styria, giving it several buildings in Graz.

Activities are managed by a Rector, a Hochshule Council (Hochschulrat), and curriculum committees (Studienkommission). All matters regarding the university colleges of teacher education come under the competence of the Federal Minister of Education and Women's Affairs (Bundesministerin bzw. Bundesminister für Bildung und Frauen), and not the Federal Minister of Science, Research and Economy (Bundesministerin bzw. Bundesminister für Wissenschaft, Forschung und Wirtschaft) as for the PhD-awarding public universities.

== Core mission ==
The aims of the University College are:

- Teaching: Science-based and professionally oriented education, training and further continuing education of teachers
- Research: Occupational and applied research in education and practice
- Development: Development of quality in schools and other educational institutions

== Teaching ==
Teacher training courses consist of four-year bachelor and one to two-year Masters courses, and some summer and continuing education courses. Applicants for teaching courses in Austria must be fluent in German, among other criteria. Fees are set federally and are free or no more than 400 euro per semester (more for students coming from outside the EU). Courses include:

- Teacher of primary education degree
- Secondary education general education degree (with 26 general education disciplines and 2 specializations)
- Secondary Education Vocational Training - Dual Education and Technical-Industrial Education, nutrition, information, and communication
- There are master's degrees in Health Promotion and Health Education (fee-paying), Primary School Education, and Emotional and Social Development among other topics.

Secondary teacher education takes place in cooperation with colleges and universities in Styria, Carinthia, and Burgenland, particularly the University of Graz, which is situated on the same street and where students obtain some disciplinary instruction.

== Research ==
The main focus is on the analysis of teaching and learning processes in school and extracurricular areas. Ongoing research at the University College involves a wide range of cooperating institutions and schools. There are eight research centres, and two Federal research centres; the Federal Center for Interculturality, Migration, and Multilingualism (BIMM) and the Federal Center for Professionalization in Educational Research (BZBF).

A number of qualified academic staff attain the title of Professor with a permanent contract and complete a mid-career Habilitation degree. However this is an individual title - they do not chair university-funded research groups of junior staff and Ph.D. students, as in the larger Austrian universities or in Germany. Their time for research may be more constrained than in public universities.
