= Party of the European Left =

Left-wing European political party

Other name
(in other official languages)
German	Partei der Europäischen Linken
Greek	Κόμμα Ευρωπαϊκής Αριστεράς
Spanish	Partido de la Izquierda Europea
French	Parti de la Gauche Européenne
Italian	Partito della Sinistra Europea
Maltese	Il-Partit Ewropew tax-Xellug
Turkish	Avrupa Sol Partisi
- Abbreviation: PEL (Note: The abbreviation "EL" is also used.)
- President: Walter Baier (AT)
- Founded: 8–9 May 2004; 22 years ago
- Headquarters: Square de Meeûs 25, 1000 Brussels, Belgium
- Think tank: Transform Europe
- Women's wing: EL-Fem
- Membership (22 December 2025): 589
- Ideology: Democratic socialism; Communism; Left-wing populism; Anti-capitalism; Soft Euroscepticism
- Political position: Left-wing to far-left
- European Parliament group: The Left in the European Parliament (majority)
- Colours: Dark red
- European Parliament: 17 / 720
- European Commission: 0 / 27
- European Council: 0 / 27
- EU lower/unicameral houses: 120 / 6,217
- EU upper houses: 22 / 1,459

Website
- european-left.org

The Party of the European Left (PEL), or European Left (EL), is a European political party that operates as an association of democratic socialist and communist political parties in the European Union and other European countries. The PEL was founded on 8–9 May 2004 in Rome. The elected MEPs from member parties of the PEL sit in The Left in the European Parliament – GUE/NGL group in the European Parliament, though not all PEL members are also members of GUE/NGL. The current president is the Austrian politician Walter Baier.

== History ==
Before the PEL was founded, most of its members already held annual meetings together, as part of the New European Left Forum (NELF). Several member and observer parties also participated in the more radical European Anti-Capitalist Left.

The Party of European Left (PEL) was formed on 8 and 9 May 2004 in Rome, Italy. The party's first congress took place on 8 October 2005 in Athens, and produced the Athens Declaration of the European Left. The second congress was held 23–25 November 2007 in Prague. The third congress was held on 2–5 December 2010 in Paris. Its fourth congress was held on 13–15 December 2013 in Madrid. Its fifth congress took place on 16–18 December 2016 in Berlin, and elected German lawyer and politician Gregor Gysi as the new PEL President. Heinz Bierbaum was elected president in 2019. He was succeeded by Walter Baier in December 2022.

It operates a think tank, Transform Europe, and it has women's wing named EL-Fem.

In 2024, the Danish member Red-Green Alliance (Enhedlisten) announced the schism of the party and the formation of a socially liberal (green- and pro-Ukraine leaning) European Left Alliance for the People and the Planet, in short ELA. The split follows the split of socially liberal Die Linke and socially conservative BSW in Germany, and the creation of a separate platform for the 2024 European elections, Now the People.

== Ideology ==
PEL has been described as a left-wing and a far-left political party. Its ideology is based on principles of democratic socialism, socialism, and communism. It is opposed to capitalism and consists of parties with wide range of opinions. PEL is also supportive of progressivism.

It takes a soft Eurosceptic approach towards the European Union, and opposes militarization and foreign interventionism. PEL opposed the Iraq War and War in Afghanistan, and criticised the oppression of 2009 Iranian presidential election protests. It is also opposed to NATO and United States military bases. It supports Cuba, and a delegation visited the nation in February 2022.

In an interview with the political magazine Jacobin, Walter Baier, the president of PEL, described PEL as part of the "socialist left" and criticised the European Union, stating that it is neoliberal and "closer to enlightened absolutism than parliamentary democracy".

== Leadership ==
As of 2026, Walter Baier (KPÖ) is President, and David Pestieau (PVDA-PTB), Marta Martín Morán (PCE) and Hélène Bidard (PCF) are the party's Vice Presidents.

History:

- President: Fausto Bertinotti (2004–2007), Lothar Bisky (2007–2010), Pierre Laurent (2010–2016), Gregor Gysi (2016–2019), Heinz Bierbaum (2019–2022), Walter Baier (2022–present)
- Leader in the European Parliament: Francis Wurtz (2004–2009), Lothar Bisky (2009–2012), Gabi Zimmer (2012–2019), Martin Schirdewan (2019–present)

== Membership ==
The Party of the European Left consists of member parties with full rights, observer parties, individual members and EL partners. As of October 2024, The Party of the European Left has 25 member parties in 20 countries. Not all members of PEL are members of The Left in the European Parliament – GUE/NGL group in the European Parliament.

=== Full members ===
Country		Party	National MPs	MEPs (Note: The number of MEPs listed below may not match the total number of MEPs of the European party, as it does not include MEPs who join as individual members.)
Austria		Communist Party of Austria	–	–
Belgium		Workers' Party of Belgium	15 / 150 (Chamber of Representatives)	1 / 22
Belgium		Workers' Party of Belgium	5 / 60 (Senate)	1 / 22
Bulgaria		Bulgarian Left	–	–
Croatia		Workers' Front	–	–
Czech Republic		The Left	–	–
Finland		Communist Party of Finland	–	–
France		French Communist Party	8 / 577 (National Assembly)	–
France		French Communist Party	14 / 348 (Senate)	–
France		Republican and Socialist Left	1 / 577 (National Assembly)	–
France		Republican and Socialist Left	0 / 348 (Senate)	–
Germany		The Left	64 / 630 (Bundestag)	3 / 96
Germany		The Left	1 / 69 (Bundesrat)	3 / 96
Greece		New Left	4 / 300	–
Greece		Syriza	14 / 300	2 / 21
Hungary		Workers' Party of Hungary 2006 – European Left	–	–
Italy		Communist Refoundation Party	–	–
Luxembourg		The Left	2 / 60	0 / 6
Romania		Romanian Socialist Party	–	–
Slovenia		The Left	5 / 90	0 / 9
Spain		United Left	5 / 350 (Congress of Deputies)	0 / 61
Spain		United Left	0 / 266 (Senate of Spain)	0 / 61
Spain		Communist Party of Spain	5 / 350 (Congress of Deputies) (Note: All of the deputies of the Communist Party of Spain are also members of United Left)	0 / 61
Spain		Communist Party of Spain	0 / 266 (Senate of Spain)	0 / 61
Spain	Catalonia	United and Alternative Left	–	–
Sweden		Future Left	–	–

=== Observer members ===
Country		Party	National MPs	European MEPs
Belgium		Mouvement Demain	–	–
Cyprus		Progressive Party of Working People	15 / 56	1 / 6
Cyprus	Northern Cyprus	New Cyprus Party	–	De facto not in the EU
Cyprus	Northern Cyprus	United Cyprus Party	–	De facto not in the EU
Czech Republic		Communist Party of Bohemia and Moravia	0 / 200 (Chamber of Deputies)	1 / 21
Czech Republic		Communist Party of Bohemia and Moravia	0 / 81 (Senate)	1 / 21
Slovakia		Communist Party of Slovakia	–	–
Spain		Sortu	1 / 23 (Congress of Deputies; Basque seats)	1 / 61
Spain		Sortu	1 / 20 (Senate of Spain; Basque seats)	1 / 61

=== EL Partners ===
Country	Party	National MPs	European MEPs
Austria	Left	–	–
France	République et Socialisme	–	–
Germany	Marxistische Linke	–	–
Hungary	Yes Solidarity for Hungary Movement	–	–
Hungary	Táncsics – Radical Left Party	listed but dissolved in 2023.	

=== Associate members ===
Country		Party	National MPs	European MEPs
Belarus		Belarusian Left Party "A Just World"	listed but dissolved in 2023.	
Moldova		Party of Communists of the Republic of Moldova	8 / 101	Not in the EU
Serbia		Solidarnost	–	Not in the EU
Switzerland		Swiss Party of Labour	–	Not in the EU
Turkey		Left Party	–	Not in the EU
United Kingdom		Left Unity	–	Not in the EU
United Kingdom	Scotland	Democratic Left Scotland	–	Not in the EU
United Kingdom	Scotland	Socialists for the Independence	–	Not in the EU

=== Former members ===
Country	Party	Notes
Austria	Der Wandel	According to its own statements, the party has been in "hibernation" since May 2026.
Belgium	Communist Party	Stopped working as a Party in 2009, since December 2013 not listed as a Member.
Belgium	Communist Party of Belgium	Resignation decided at the party congress on 30 July 2018.
Belgium	Communists of Wallonia-Brussels	
Czech Republic	Party of Democratic Socialism	Merged into The Left in 2020.
Denmark	Red–Green Alliance	Left the EL in 2024.
Estonia	Left Alliance	Delisted from the EL website in 2025.
Finland	Left Alliance	Delisted from the EL website in 2024.
France	Ensemble!	Dissolved in 2025.
France	La France Insoumise	Member until 2018, observer until 2024.
France	Left Party	Left the EL on 1 July 2018.
France	Unitary Left	Merged with the French Communist Party in 2015.
Germany	German Communist Party	Ended its observer status on 27 February 2016.
Greece	Renewing Communist Ecological Left	Merged into Syriza in 2013.
Hungary	Hungarian Workers' Party	Quit 1 May 2009.
Italy	Italian Left	Observer until 2025, left to join ELA.
Italy	Party of Italian Communists	Dissolved in December 2014, which meant that the "observer status" was lost.
Italy	The Other Europe	Dissolved in 2019, which meant that the "observer status" was lost.
Poland	Young Socialists	Dissolved in 2015, which meant that the "observer status" was lost.
Portugal	Left Bloc	Quit 22 June 2024.
United Kingdom	Transform Party	Dissolved in 2025, merged in Your Party.

=== Individual members ===
EL also includes a number of individual members. While it has had a steadily high number of individual members, and currently the highest number, EL has not sought to develop mass individual membership.

Below is the evolution of individual membership of EL since 2019.

== Funding ==
As a registered European political party, EL is entitled to European public funding, which it has received continuously since 2004.

Below is the evolution of European public funding received by EL.

In line with the Regulation on European political parties and European political foundations, EL also raises private funds to co-finance its activities. As of 2025, European parties must raise at least 10% of their reimbursable expenditure from private sources, while the rest can be covered using European public funding. (Note: For the purpose of European party funding, "contributions" refer to financial or in-kind support provided by party members, while "donations" refer to the same but provided by non-members.)

Below is the evolution of contributions and donations received by EL.

== Representation in European institutions ==
Organisation	Institution	Number of seats
European Union	European Parliament	17 / 720 (2%)
European Union	European Commission	0 / 27 (0%)
European Union	European Council (Heads of Government)	0 / 27 (0%)
European Union	Council of the European Union (Participation in Government)	
European Union	Committee of the Regions	0 / 329 (0%)
Council of Europe (as part of UEL)	Parliamentary Assembly	35 / 612 (6%)

== See also ==
- European Anti-Capitalist Left
- European United Left–Nordic Green Left
- Initiative of Communist and Workers' Parties
- List of communist parties represented in European Parliament
- Nordic Green Left Alliance
- Now the People
- Unified European Left Group
- European political party
- Authority for European Political Parties and European Political Foundations
- European political foundation
