= Young Left (Austria) =

Austrian youth organisation

Young Left Junge Linke
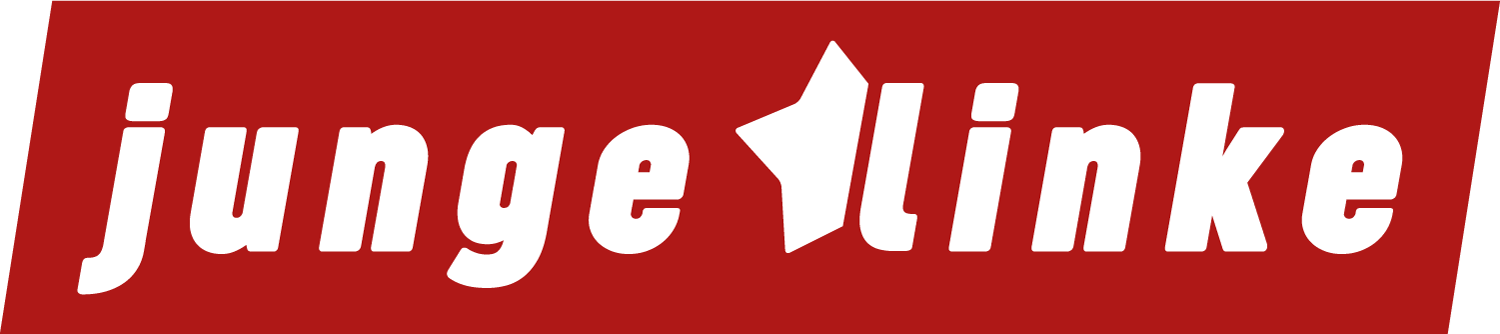
- Abbreviation: JL
- Spokesperson: Hannah Pichler
- Political Director: Lukas Zwerina
- Finance Officer: Emily Draper
- Assessors: Jana Rainer; Merlin Thurow; Roberta Jelinek; Leonard Ibitz
- Founded: 10 June 2018
- Preceded by: Young Greens
- Membership (2021): >300
- Ideology: Communism
- Political position: Far-left
- National affiliation: KPÖ Plus
- Colours: Red; Purple

Website
- jungelinke.at

The Young Left (German: Junge Linke; JL) is the youth wing of the Communist Party of Austria (KPÖ).

== Political positions ==
The association sees itself as clearly politically left and part of the communist movement and describes itself as "the only nationwide youth organization that is working on building a strong left-wing force". The Young Left strives for a "solidary society" that is free from poverty and discrimination.

== Organization ==
The Young Left is organized in district groups and national organizations. The pioneering political and strategic decisions of the federal organization are made at the annual federal congress, at which all members are entitled to vote. The federal congress also elects the federal board, the executive body of the young left. The work of the federal board is controlled by the federal committee, which consists of delegates from the state and district divisions and is confirmed by the federal congress.

== History ==
Spokespersons for the Young Left
Year	Spokesperson
2018–2019	Flora Petrik
2019–2020	Tobias Schweiger
2020–2025	Alisa Vengerova
since 2025	Hannah Pichler

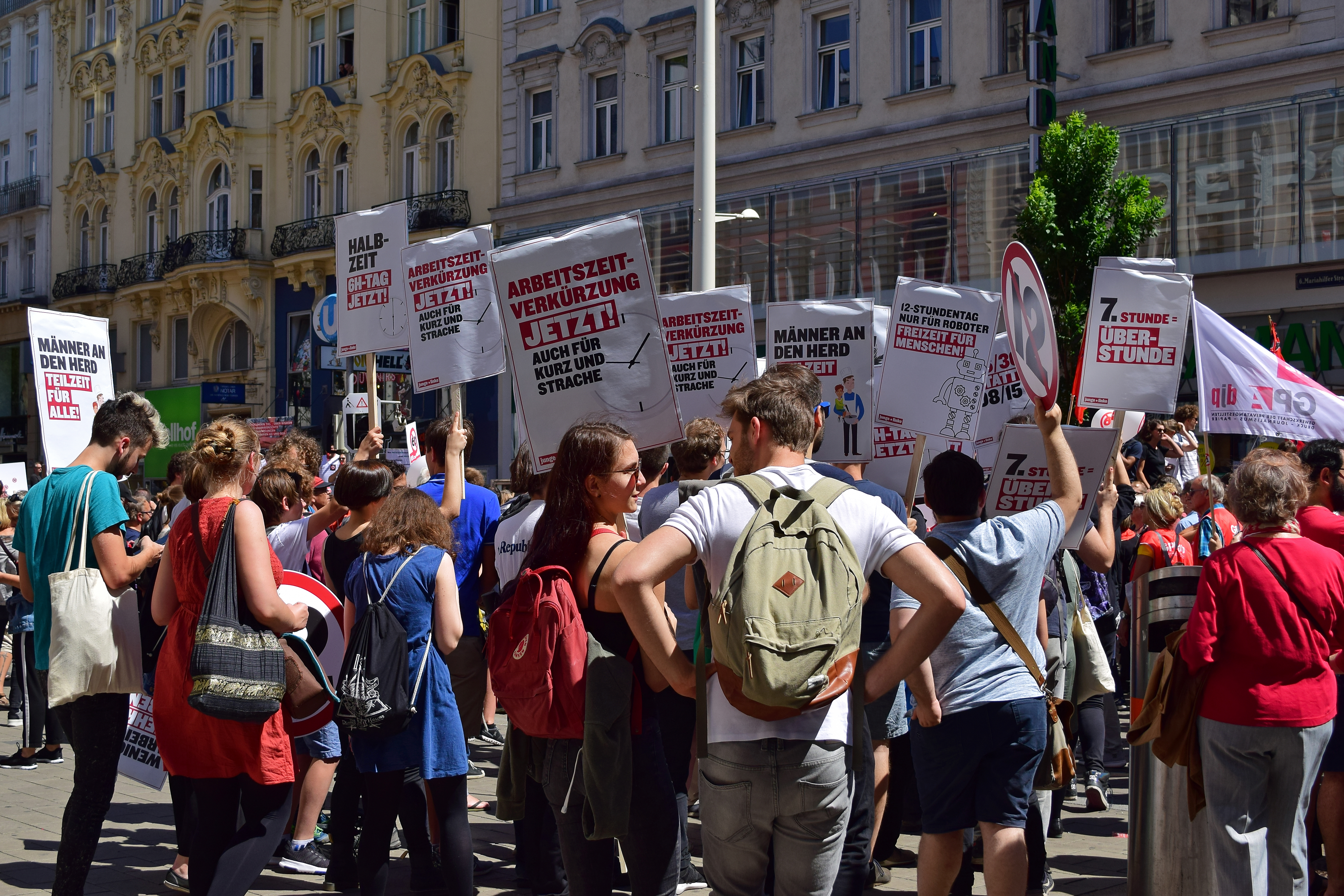
Members of Junge Linke at a demonstration in Juni 2018

The Young Left were founded in Linz in June 2018. They represent the successor organization of the Young Greens and initially symbolized the end of the developments around the youth of Austria's Greens, who separated from their youth organization in spring 2017 – a new party youth organization of the Greens, the "Green Youth – Green alternative youth". Sarah Pansy was elected as the political director, in addition to her and Flora Petrik, five other members belonged to the board of directors. After the Young Greens split off from the Green Party, many members of the Young Greens were also members of the new organization Young Left. In addition, the existing association Junge Linke was merged into the new organization, which previously had active groups mainly in Lower Austria, Upper Austria, and Vienna.

In the summer of 2018, the first regional organizations such as those in Lower Austria, Upper Austria, Salzburg, Styria and Vienna were founded.

In March 2018, the former Junge Linke member Kay-Michael Dankl gained 3.7% of the votes in the Salzburg municipal council elections for the KPÖ and thus received a mandate. On May 8 he was sworn in as a member of the parish council.

== See also ==
- Socialist Youth Austria (SJÖ)
- Communist Youth Austria (KJÖ)
- Left Youth Solid (Germany)
- European Network of Democratic Young Left (former European network)
