= Communist Youth of Austria =

Austrian youth organisation

Communist Youth Austria Kommunistische Jugend Österreich (KJÖ)
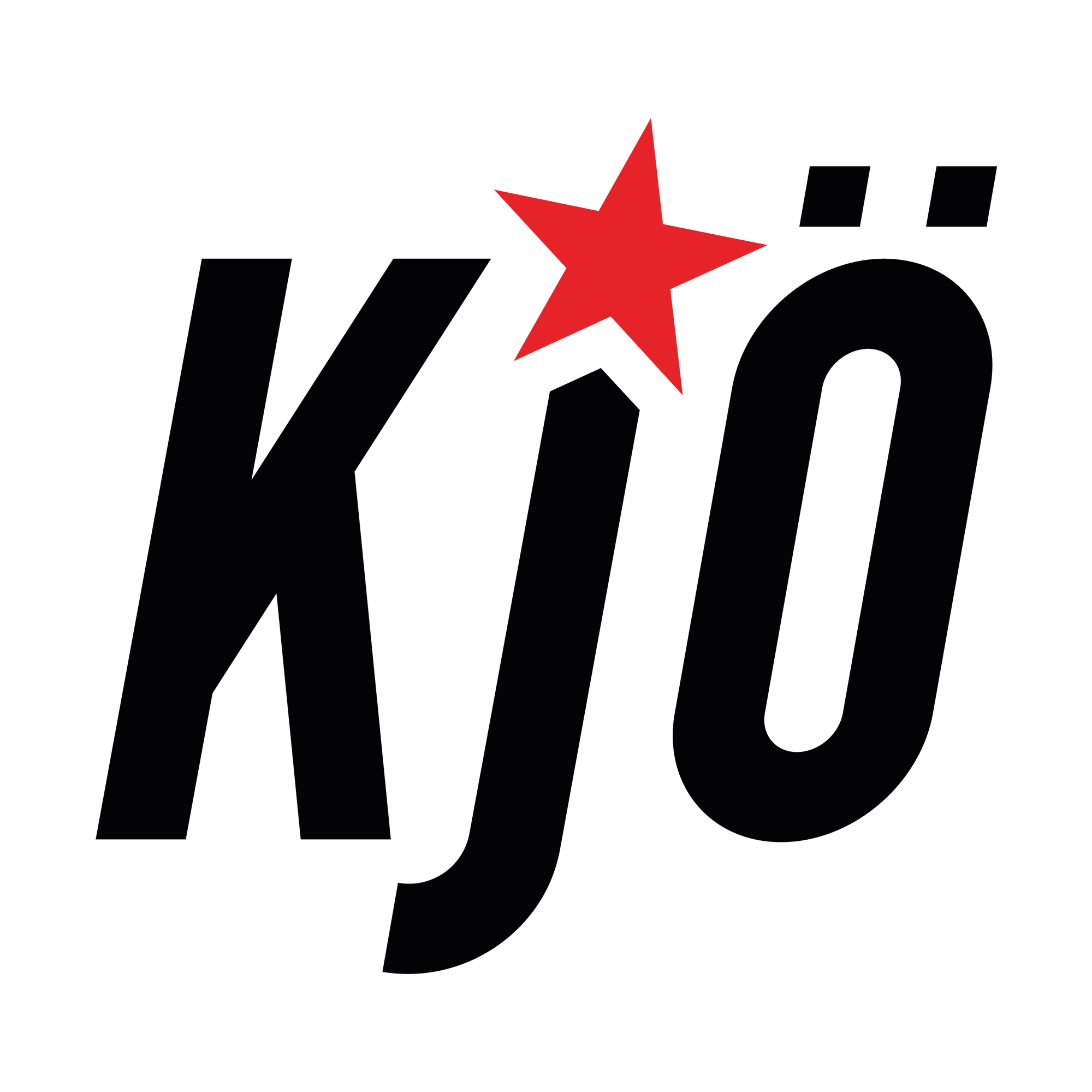
- Chairperson: Johannes Lutz
- Founded: May 10, 1970
- Headquarters: Lagergasse 98a, A-8020; Graz, Austria
- Ideology: Communism; Antimilitarism; Anti-fascism; Anti-capitalism; Marxist feminism
- International affiliation: Meeting of European Communist Youth Organizations (MECYO)
- European affiliation: World Federation of Democratic Youth (WFDY)
- Newspaper: Vorneweg
- Website: kommunistischejugend.at

KJÖ demonstration in Vienna, 2011

The Communist Youth of Austria (German: Kommunistische Jugend Österreichs, KJÖ) is an independent youth organization. It was associated with the Communist Party of Austria (German: Kommunistische Partei Österreichs, KPÖ) for a long time, but since 2005, the KJÖ has increasingly distanced itself from the federal party. However, it continues to work closely with the KPÖ in Styria.

== History ==
=== 1918–1945 ===
The KJÖ, rooted in the tradition of the Austrian Communist Youth Association (KJV), was founded on November 8, 1918.

The KJV was active in youth work, with several youth delegations visiting the Soviet Union. In the early 1930s, state persecution intensified, forcing the KJV to operate under increasingly precarious and often illegal conditions. The focus of its activities was on the fight against fascism, frequently resulting in clashes with SA units. By 1934, when Engelbert Dollfuss came to power, the KJV had become the most significant antifascist youth movement in Austria.

During the Spanish Civil War, the KJV was involved in solidarity efforts with the young Spanish Republic, organizing actions such as the "One Machine Gun for Spain" campaign by the Meidling KJV. Additionally, 250 KJV members joined the International Brigades.

Following the Nazi takeover in Austria, conditions for the KJV worsened further. Despite waves of arrests, executions, and concentration camps, young Communists continued their fight against fascism. They conducted sabotage operations, distributed leaflets denouncing the war and Nazism, and advocated for a free, independent Austria. They also sent numerous "subversive" letters to front-line soldiers and attempted to infiltrate the Hitler Youth. Many joined partisan groups, though these did not reach the scale or impact of those in Yugoslavia or Greece.

Others emigrated and founded the youth organization Young Austria in Great Britain.

=== 1945–1970 ===
In 1945, the Free Austrian Youth (FÖJ) was founded, consisting of Communists, Socialists, and Catholics. The FÖJ aimed to build a democratic and free Austria beyond ideological boundaries. The FÖJ played a significant role in the October strikes of 1950.

=== Since 1970 ===
At the end of 1968, a majority within the FÖJ protested against the KPÖ’s shift in policy, particularly its justification of the suppression of the Prague Spring. Throughout 1969, this led to increasing alienation between the KPÖ and the FÖJ. As a result, on May 10, 1970, the FÖJ was re-established as the KJÖ was founded under the slogan "The Future – Socialism".

In the 1970s, the KJÖ was especially active in the Chile solidarity movement, following the violent overthrow of Chile’s leftist Popular Unity government in a military coup supported by the CIA (see also: History of Chile). Additionally, the organization prioritized advocating for the interests of young workers and vocational students, and it played a key role in peace movement activities. The collapse of socialist states in Central and Eastern Europe triggered a crisis within the KJÖ. In response, the organization's name was expanded to "KJÖ-Junge Linke" to reflect its continued aim of building a broad, influential left-wing youth movement by engaging young people with diverse political perspectives.

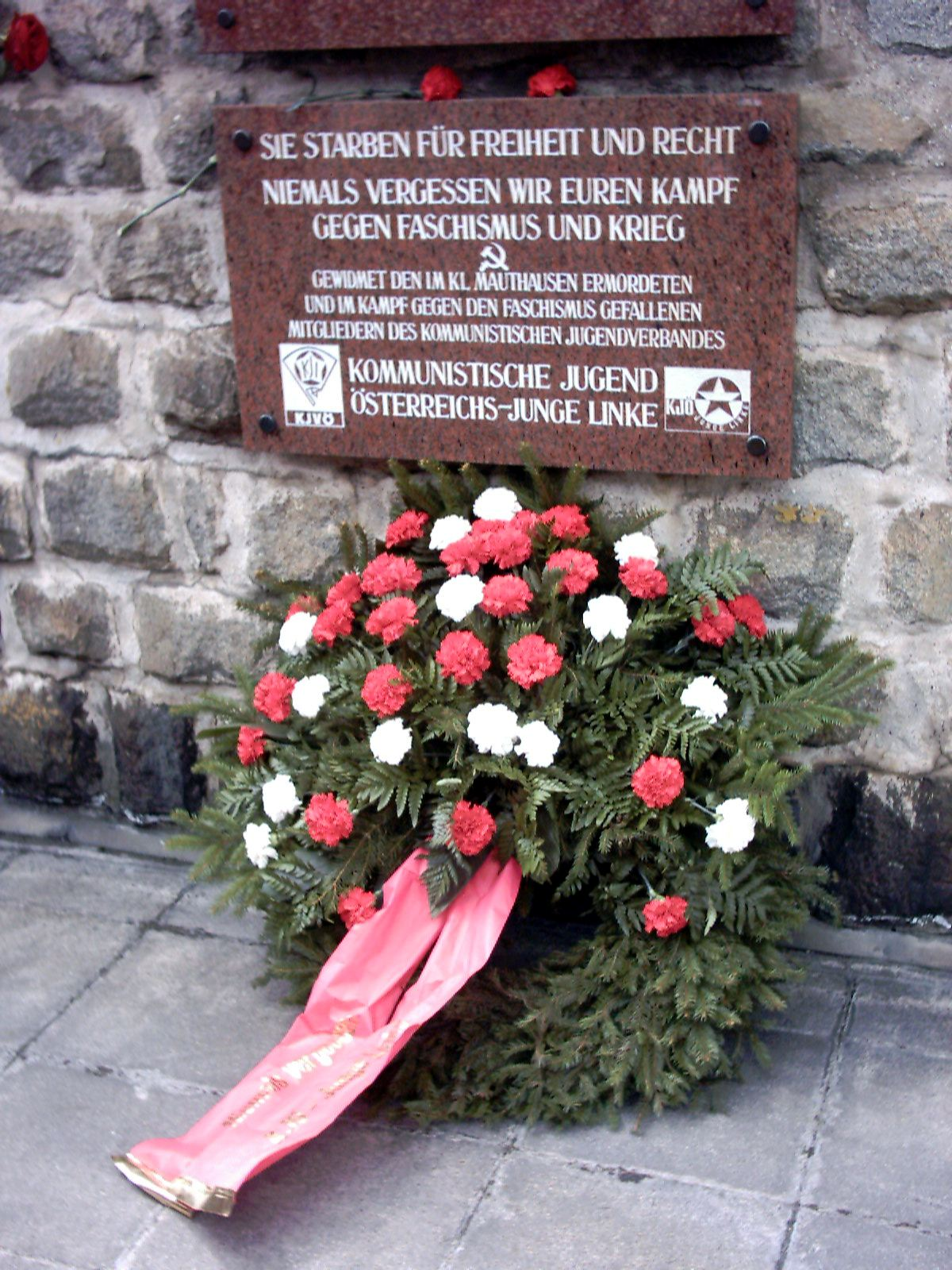
Commemorative plaque erected by the KJÖ at KZ Mauthausen

The KJÖ has been involved in various movements, including protests against the formation of the conservative-right government coalition and opposition to the Iraq War. The organization also takes a stand against neo-Nazi activities and social cuts. In Braunau am Inn, the KJÖ organizes a major anti-fascist protest each year just before Hitler's birthday, supported by Mayor Gerhard Skiba and Green Party National Council member Karl Öllinger.

The KJÖ opposes war, neofascism, Austrian membership in the EU and cuts in social welfare.

Since 2004, following the KPÖ’s 33rd Party Congress, the KJÖ is an independent organisation.

On February 16, 2007, American celebrity Paris Hilton was in Vienna for an autograph session in a mall when she had to be rushed offstage because members of the Communist Youth began throwing tubes of lipstick and lit cigarettes at her. They also distributed fliers explaining the reason of the protest.

In 2008 the KJÖ dismissed the former addendum "Young Left" in its name and was admitted to the Styrian youth advisory council.

In 2019, 2021 and 2022 the KJÖ in Graz organized the ErntePUNKfest (HarvestPUNKfest) together with the Punk Verein Austria.

== Structure ==
The KJÖ is organized according to the principles of democratic centralism.

KJÖ members are encouraged to organize themselves into local groups and hold group meetings.

The highest body of the KJÖ is the Federal Congress, which meets at least every two years and includes all members with voting rights. The Federal Congress elects the Federal Leadership, which is responsible for the practical and organizational implementation of decisions. Between Federal Congresses, group representative meetings are held, where each group is represented by 2 delegates with voting rights. The group representative meetings can convene the Federal Congress and perform other functions.

Other organs include the Federal Plenary (which is similar to the Federal Congress but does not conduct elections), financial oversight, and, as needed, regional structures.

The KJÖ is the only Austrian organization that is a member of the World Federation of Democratic Youth (WBDJ).

== Relationship with the KPÖ ==
The KJÖ was long regarded as the youth organization of the KPÖ. However, following the KPÖ’s 33rd Party Congress in 2004 and the subsequent de facto split within the party, the KJÖ no longer identified as an affiliate of the federal KPÖ, instead positioning itself as an independent communist youth organization. In 2018, the founding of the Young Left as the official youth wing of the KPÖ further solidified the KJÖ's separation from the party.

The KJÖ maintains good and friendly relations with the Communist Student Association (KSV) and the KPÖ in Styria. In Tyrol, during the 2008 state elections, there was an electoral alliance between the KPÖ and the KJÖ, achieving the best result for a communist list since 1956.

The KJÖ participates in the Volksstimmenfest, a festival organized by the KPÖ.
