= Walter Baier =

Austrian politician and editor

- Baier at the 2023 Die Linke party conference in Germany

President of the Party of the European Left
- Incumbent
- Assumed office 11 December 2022
- Preceded by: Heinz Bierbaum

President of the Communist Party of Austria
- In office 1994 – 2006
- Preceded by: Melina Klaus
- Succeeded by: Otto Bruckner

Personal details
- Born: 9 February 1954 (age 72) Vienna, Austria
- Party: Communist Party of Austria

Walter Baier (born 9 February 1954) is an Austrian politician for the Communist Party of Austria (KPÖ). He was his party's federal president from 1994 to 2006. He is the leader of the Party of the European Left since December 2022 and was the party's lead candidate for the European Commission in the 2024 election.

== Biography ==
Born in Vienna, Baier was the son of a communist who was interred at Dachau concentration camp, but Baier did not ascribe to communism until into his adult years. Baier was the federal president of the KPÖ from 1994 to 2006.

In October 2004, Baier sold the Ernst-Kirchweger-Haus, a Vienna building owned by the party and rented out to communal groups for a symbolic rent of one Austrian schilling a year. The running of the house had cost €17,000 a year. He faced criticism from some on the Austrian left, including Nobel Prize in Literature laureate Elfriede Jelinek. The criticism intensified when the buyer turned out to be a real estate company whose director shared a name and possibly an address with a man doxed as a neo-Nazi in 1977; the house was named after an Austrian communist murdered by Nazis.

In 2009, a lawsuit against Baier by the writer on far-right politics Wolfgang Purtscheller was dismissed in the Vienna Commercial Court. Purtscheller had said in an interview with Der Standard that Austria's three main parties after World War II, including the KPÖ, had specialist units for former Nazis. In his history of the party, Baier called Purtscheller's claim a distortion of history, and Purtscheller sued to prohibit the sale of Baier's book. The court dismissed the suit, citing Baier's freedom of speech.

In 2011, Baier was one of four atheists invited by Pope Benedict XVI to the Inter-Faith Summit in Assisi, Italy. The others were Guillermo Hurtado, Julia Kristeva and Remo Bodei.

Baier was elected leader of the Party of the European Left in December 2022. In his first speech, he called for Russian withdrawal from Ukraine and an end to the war through negotiations, while also championing anti-racism, feminism and climate action. Baier was elected unopposed as the party's lead candidate in the 2024 European Parliament election, seeking election to the European Commission, but was not put on any electoral list to be elected to the European Parliament.
