= Volksstimme (Austrian newspaper) =

Daily newspaper in Austria (1945–1991)

- Type: Daily newspaper; Weekly newspaper
- Publisher: Globus Verlag
- Founded: 5 August 1945
- Ceased publication: 3 March 1991
- Political alignment: Communism
- Language: German
- Headquarters: Vienna
- Country: Austria
- OCLC number: 32276137

Volksstimme (German: People’s Voice) was a communist newspaper published between 5 August 1945 and 3 March 1991 in Vienna, Austria.

== History and profile ==
The newspaper was first published in Vienna on 5 August 1945 under the name of Österreichische Volksstimme (German: Austrian People's Voice). The paper was the organ of the Austrian Communist Party. The founding publisher was Globus Verlag. Its sister publication was a monthly theoretical journal entitled Weg und Ziel.

The paper was renamed as Volksstimme on 21 February 1957. Its frequency was also changed over time: it was started as a daily, but then it began to be published on a weekly basis. It published news on national and international affairs as well as official party documents. The paper was also a platform for the fractions within the party to express and defend their views about the events. Georg Auer worked for the paper as a motoring correspondent in the 1950s.

Volkstimme was deeply affected by the Soviet activities in Europe during the Cold War due to its reports and the different approaches in the Communist Party. After the 1956 events in Hungary the paper was censored by the Austrian Chancellor Julius Raab. Following the Prague Spring and the invasion of Czechoslovakia by the Soviet Union a conflict occurred in the Austrian Communist Party which also affected Volksstimme in that most of its reporters left the paper in 1968. It ceased publication on 3 March 1991.
