= Communist Party of Austria =

Political party in Austria

Communist Party of Austria Kommunistische Partei Österreichs
- Abbreviation: KPÖ
- Chairman: Günther Hopfgartner
- Spokesperson: Tobias Schweiger
- Organizational Secretary: Sarah Pansy
- Founded: 3 November 1918
- Headquarters: Drechslergasse 42; A-1140 Vienna
- Newspaper: Argument; Volksstimme; (1945–1991)
- Student wing: Communist Student Association
- Youth wing: Young Left; Communist Youth of Austria
- Membership (2021): c. 2,000
- Ideology: Communism; Socialism; Marxism
- Political position: Left-wing to far-left
- National affiliation: KPÖ Plus
- European affiliation: Party of the European Left
- International affiliation: IMCWP
- Colours: Red Black; Maroon (customary)
- National Council: 0 / 183
- Federal Council: 0 / 60
- European Parliament: 0 / 20
- Governorships: 0 / 9
- Landtag seats: 6 / 440

Website
- kpoe.at

The Communist Party of Austria (German: Kommunistische Partei Österreichs, KPÖ) is a Marxist and communist political party in Austria. Established in 1918 as the Communist Party of German-Austria (KPDÖ), it is one of the world's oldest communist parties. The KPÖ was banned between 1933 and 1945 under both the Austrofascist regime and the Nazi German administration of Austria after the 1938 Anschluss.

The KPÖ holds two seats in the Styrian and four seats in the Salzburg Landtag (state parliament), but has not had representation in the National Council (Nationalrat, Austria's federal parliament) since 1959. In the 2019 Austrian legislative election held on 29 September, it won only 0.7% of the votes (32,736 out of a total of 4,835,469), well below the 4% minimum to obtain seats in the National Council. The party's vote share increased markedly to 2.4% in the 2024 Austrian legislative election, although still falling below the electoral threshold. At the local level, the KPÖ has held the mayorship of Graz, Austria's second largest city, since 2021, and holds over 130 seats on district and municipal councils across the country.

The KPÖ is part of the Party of the European Left. The party has slowly moved towards Eurocommunism since the 1970s; however, it denies being a merely more radical version of the Greens or Social Democrats, asserting that they are fundamentally different.

== History ==
=== Background and establishment ===
The KPÖ was officially established on 3 November 1918.

=== First Republic, Second World War, and resistance to Nazism ===
During the First Republic, the KPÖ had little influence and failed to gain a single mandate in parliament, in part because of the ability of the Social Democratic Party (SPÖ) to unite the workers as an opposition movement. The party was also seriously weakened by internal factional struggles. In parallel with the ascent of Joseph Stalin to General Secretary in the Soviet Union in the early 1920s, the KPÖ was also refashioned in accordance with the principles of democratic centralism, and party discipline was more strictly enforced. Due to these reforms, the party was able to overcome its factional struggles by the late-1920s.

In 1933 the KPÖ was banned by an emergency decree of the Austrofascist government of Engelbert Dollfuss but continued to operate underground. According to internal sources, the KPÖ had been prepared for this situation since the mid-1920s. The KPÖ took part in the failed workers rebellion on 12 February 1934, which was sparked by the militia Republikanischer Schutzbund (English: Republican Defense League). It marked a last attempt to save Austrian democracy from fascism, but was ill-fated.

The KPÖ held a line which was often in disagreement with the Communist Party of the Soviet Union, such as disagreeing with Stalin's branding of social democracy as a form of "social fascism" in the late 1920s. The Austrian communists dissent was avant-garde, with their refusal to condemn Social Democracy reflecting aspects of the 7th World Congress of the Comintern in 1935. The Austrian communists' tolerant stance opened their party to an influx of more disappointed Social Democrats. After the crushing of the February 1934 uprising by the federal army and the Heimwehr, the KPÖ grew rapidly from 4,000 to 16,000 members.

"The view that the Austrian people are a part of the German nation is theoretically unfounded. A union of the German nation, in which also the Austrians are included, never existed and does not exist today either. The Austrian people have lived under different economic and political conditions than the remaining Germans in the "Reich", and have therefore chosen another national development. How far this process of a national development is, and/or how close the connections from the common descent and common language are, only a concrete investigation of its history can answer that."

— Alfred Klahr (under his pseudonym "Rudolf"), after being asked in 1936 by the communist leadership in exile in Prague if the theoretical notion of an independent Austrian nation separate from Germany existed.

The KPÖ also took an independent stance from the mainstream in its views about nationhood and an Austrian identity separate from Germany, with leading communist intellectual Alfred Klahr writing that the view that the Austrian people were a part of Germany was theoretically unfounded. In contrast, many Austrian Social Democrats regarded the affiliation to the German nation as natural and even desirable. Echoing the thoughts of Klahr, the KPÖ expressed its firm belief in an independent Austria when the country was annexed to Nazi Germany in March 1938. In their historic call An das österreichische Volk (English: To the Austrian People), the party denounced Adolf Hitler's dictatorship and called on all people to fight together for an independent Austria.

As a result of the Molotov–Ribbentrop Pact of 1939, a number of Austrian communists-in-exile, such as KPÖ founder member Franz Koritschoner, were deported from the Soviet Union and handed over to the Nazis. After war broke out between Germany and the Soviet Union, the Soviets quickly reverted their stance and tried to support the Austrian Communists against Nazi Germany.

During Nazi rule, the KPÖ played an important role in the Austrian resistance, fighting side by side with former political enemies such as Christian socialists, Catholics, Monarchists, and farmers against Hitler's regime. The KPÖ took seriously the order of the Allied Powers in the Moscow Declaration from October 1943, which called for Austria's "own contribution" to its liberation from fascism as a precondition for the resurrection of their own state. More than 4,000 communists were imprisoned or sent to concentration camps and more than 2,000 lost their lives during the resistance, including 13 members of the KPÖ's central committee. Among them was Gisela Tschofenig, who was murdered in a labour camp on 27 April 1945. There was also an Austrian communist resistance network in Belgium, the Österreichische Freiheitsfront (English: Austrian Freedom Front).

There is some disagreement amongst historians if the KPÖ fought the Nazis out of patriotism, or followed the pattern of the ideological fight of communism against fascism in general. Internal party documents show the truth as somewhere in the middle; the KPÖ wanted their country free from German occupation as much as they wanted it to become communist.

=== Second Republic ===
A post-war electoral poster saying that "the Communists have made the most sacrifices in the liberation [from Nazi Germany]" and demanding "a free and independent Austria".

After Austria regained its independence from Germany, the KPÖ reached national importance, as it was, for the most part, able to count on the support of the occupying Soviet authorities. In the first provisional government under Karl Renner, the KPÖ was represented by seven members, along with ten socialists, and nine Christian socialists. Party chairman Johann Koplenig became vice-chancellor, while fellow communists Franz Honner and Ernst Fischer were made ministers responsible for home affairs and education respectively. However, Renner outflanked the Communists by having two powerful undersecretaries in each ministry, to which were appointed anticommunists. During the years of national reconstruction, the KPÖ vehemently criticised the "capitalistic reconstruction at the expense of the working class" and totally rejected the Marshall Plan.

The KPÖ assured the Soviets that they could win as much as 30% of the vote in the first National Council elections in 1945. However, the KPÖ won only 5.4% of the votes (174,257 votes) and was thus represented with only 4 members (out of 165) in the Austrian parliament. Nevertheless, chancellor Leopold Figl (of the right-wing ÖVP) offered the party a ministerial position in the government, and communist Karl Altmann was made Minister for Energy. With the beginning of the Cold War, and the continuing arguments over the Marshall Plan, Altmann resigned from his office in 1947 and the KPÖ became an opposition party.

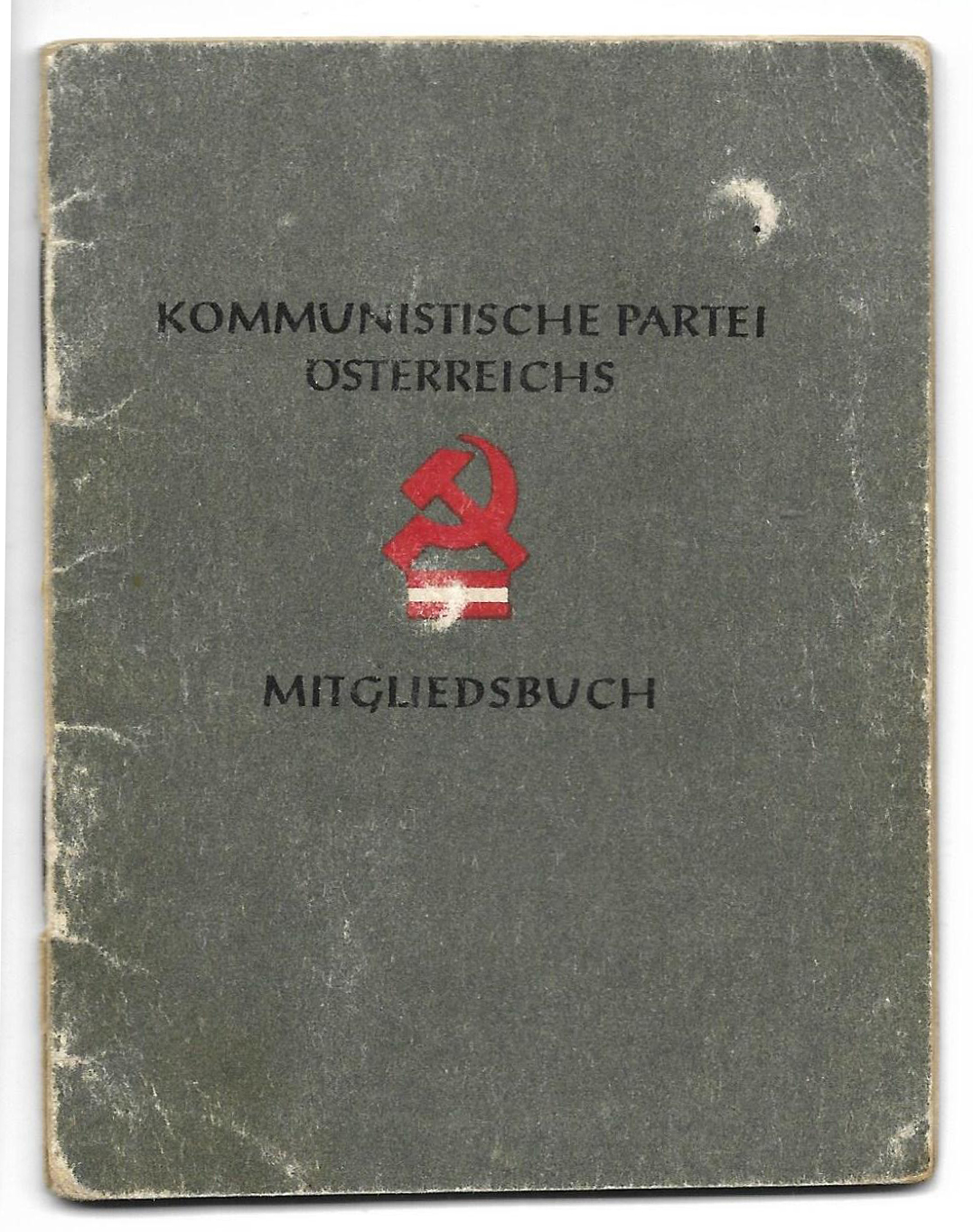
1945 Austrian Communist Party (KPÖ) membership booklet. Issued in Vienna and used up to 1947.

=== General strikes of 1950 ===
Post-war, the national economy was in ruins, and the ÖVP-led government instituted a severe austerity programme. The planned measures (Viertes Lohn- und Preisabkommen, English: Fourth wage and price-fixing agreement) included substantial price increases but minor wage increases, and large-scale strike movements formed in protest from 26 September to 6 October 1950. This, the largest strike action in the post-war history of Austria, started in the Steyr and Voest factories and the nitrogen plants in the American zone of occupation, and by 10:00 a.m. the number of strikers reached 15,000. Over 120,000 workers participated in the first day of the strike. However, the interruption of the strike to legitimize it with a conference of all Austrian work councils took the momentum out of the movement and in the second phase the concentration of strikes shifted to the Soviet zone of occupation.

In the morning of Wednesday 27 September, thousands of pro-communist strike workers took control over ÖGB regional headquarters in Linz and Graz with their communication infrastructure. Again, the police stayed aside but the Socialists in Vienna scrambled all their resources to weaken the communist influence. By the end of the day police and paramilitary units forced the Communists out of ÖGB buildings in British and American zones. On 28 September, the communists raised seventy volunteers to storm the national ÖGB office in Vienna, and were routed by the police. By 7 p.m. on 27 September, even the Soviets agreed that the strike failed and their radio program instructed Austrian workers to return to work. The ÖGB rejected the strike. The KPÖ took a prominent role in this strike, leading politicians of the incumbent grand coalition to fear a coup d'état, with the goal of the installation of a people's republic. The KPÖ denied these allegations.

A second series of strikes began the following week, in Vienna and Lower Austria, and involved approximately 19% of industrial workforce. The strikers made the impact worse by disrupting railroad traffic. They stormed the Stadlau station in Donaustadt three times, were forced away three times, and then blocked the tracks until the evening. On 5 October, they resumed the blockade of Stadlau from 5 a.m., took control of the Nordbahnhof and threatened the Südbahnhof. With the police disabled, railroads were defended by their employees and the volunteers of the "Olah battalion". They were armed with clubs, operated in small teams, and engaged the Communists in hand-to-hand fighting at first opportunity. There were reports that the Soviets provided trucks to move communist crews around, but this was as far as the Soviets went in supporting the strike.

On 5 October, the chairman of the Building and Wood workers Trade Union, Franz Olah, succeeded in negotiating the dissolution of the October strikes. Olah organised workers who supported the SPÖ into clashes with the communists, where they were able to outnumber and defeat them. This caused great friction between the KPÖ and many SPÖ members. The fact that the Soviet Red Army did not interfere also brought the strikes to an end.

=== Weaknesses and crises ===
During the 10-year allied occupation from 1945 to 1955, the threat of national division similar to that which befell post-war Germany loomed large. The Iron Curtain was dividing the European continent into two halves. During this period, the KPÖ was in constant contact with the Soviet authorities and Moscow. Following the party's poor results in the parliamentary elections on 25 November 1945 (St. Catherine's Day, therefore the elections became known as the Katharinen-Wahl), the KPÖ representative in Moscow, Friedrich Hexmann, had to present a report to the Politburo with proposals on how to improve the situation for the party. The problem with the strategy of the communists was identified as being their goal to build a future coalition (Volksfront) with the SPÖ. This required a right-wing shift to the extent that ideological differences between the KPÖ and the SPÖ were not readily apparent.

The closeness of the KPÖ to Moscow also made many voters wary of the party and its aims. In the former territories of the Austro-Hungarian Empire, multiparty democratic systems were slowly but surely being penetrated and undermined by local pro-Soviet communist parties with covert or even overt support of the Soviets, as was observable in Czechoslovakia, Hungary, and Poland. As the Iron Curtain was being drawn closed, Austrians feared the same fate as their neighbours.

Talks between party leader Johann Koplenig and Stalin (Sondermappe Codename: Gen. Filipof(f)) resulted in proposals of a possible division of Austria between East and West, similar to Germany. Since the KPÖ was constantly losing votes in parliamentary elections, a division and establishment of a communist-led East Austria would have been a practical way to consolidate at least a part of their dwindling power. The Soviet authorities in Moscow showed little interest for such a division for various reasons, namely because the size of a newly established East Austria would have been quite small and may not have been capable of existing without significant Soviet assistance. Already, the situation in the Soviet sector of Austria was difficult as the Soviets confiscated all industries, factories, and goods and transported anything of economic value back to the Soviet Union as part of war-reparations. Strategically, a division of Austria would have ultimately meant that a West Austria, closely linked to NATO, would have provided a connection between West Germany and Italy. A united, neutral Austria however could act as a barrier, together with Switzerland, thereby securing a part of the Central European front for the Soviets. The proposals by the Austrian communists were therefore brushed aside.

Moscow wanted a guarantee of neutrality as a pre-condition for the release of Austria into independence; the country would not be allowed to join either side of the Iron Curtain. As negotiations were underway, the KPÖ changed its tactics. The KPÖ swerved to Moscow's stance and supported the idea of neutrality during the negotiations of the Austrian State Treaty. Many members of other parties, such as Leopold Figl, did not want neutrality, but a firm anchoring with the West and NATO. However, the Soviets were able to push this demand through. The Austrian State Treaty was voted upon on 15 May 1955, with the declaration of neutrality proclaimed on 26 October 1955. This was decided in the National Council with the votes of the ÖVP, SPÖ, and the KPÖ; the Federation of Independents (VdU, the forerunner of the FPÖ) voted against neutrality.

Because of the economic recovery and the end of the occupation in 1955, the protective power of the Soviet occupiers was lost to the KPÖ. The party lost a main pillar of support and was shaken by internal crisis. Like many other communist parties around the world, the KPÖ had oriented itself towards Marxism-Leninism of the Stalinist brand, and has closely allied itself at this point with the line of the Soviet Communist Party. The party's failure to condemn the bloody suppression of the 1956 Hungarian uprising led to a wave of withdrawals from the party. On 10 May 1959, the KPÖ lost representation in the National Council, receiving 142,578 votes, 3.3% of the total tally and thus missing the 4% election threshold to receive seats.

The invasion of Czechoslovakia by Soviet troops in 1968 during the Prague Spring was at first condemned by the KPÖ. However, in 1971, the party revised its position and swung back to the Soviet line. A critic of these developments, the former KPÖ Minister of Education, Ernst Fischer (who branded it "tank communism"), was expelled from the party, and readmitted only in 1998.

Due to a continuing fall in support in the late 1970s and early 1980s, the party flirted briefly with a rightward move towards Eurocommunism and democratic socialism. This, in turn, provoked the protest of the party's core supporters, who saw little difference to social democracy, and feared a weakening of the communist cause. Following the reforms, more than one third of the party's members left. The leadership of the KPÖ eventually backtracked from these changes, and the party restored the connections to the CPSU.

Having previously had 150,000 members directly following World War II, the party's ranks shrank to approximately 35,000 in the 1960s and to a few thousands in the 1970s. As of 2005, membership stands at about 3,500 members. The KPÖ was represented in the National Council from 1945 until 1959, in the state assemblies (Landtage) (with some interruptions) of Salzburg until 1949, in Lower Austria until 1954, in the Burgenland until 1956, in Vienna until 1969 and in Carinthia as well as Styria until 1970. In Upper Austria, the Tyrol and Vorarlberg the KPÖ never held state representation.

=== After the fall of the Socialist Bloc ===
With the fall of communism in Eastern Europe and the Soviet Union, the KPÖ saw itself confronted with new challenges regarding its philosophy and future. The experiment with a moderate form of eurocommunism was not well received with its core supporters; however, moderate voters could not be persuaded either. The KPÖ faced difficult times during a period where communist parties throughout the world were receding.

In January 1990 two new leaders, Walter Silbermayr and Susanne Sohn, were appointed to renew the party and uncover errors and mistakes which were made in the past. The attempts by Sohn and Silbermayr to create a leftist alliance (Wahlbündnis) for the 1990 National Council elections failed. The party lost about a third of its members during the process. In March 1991, only three months later, both chairpersons resigned, with their course of renewal being insufficiently supported internally by party-members.

The party has consistently been critical of the NATO and the European Union, comparing Austria's accession to the EU in 1995 to the Anschluß by Nazi-Germany. The party campaigned against the European Constitution in its planned form; however, it does not regard leaving the European Union as an immediate priority, but as a long-term goal.

Until 2003, there was an official celebration on the Jesuitenwiese in the Vienna Prater park, normally held each year in the first weekend of September. The celebration was named Volksstimmefest, after the party's former newspaper. Due to financial reasons, the festival was unable to take place in 2004. It has, however, since staged a comeback, being held again in September 2005 and all years since. Today, the KPÖ sees itself as part of the anti-globalisation movement as well as a feminist party. It ran together with LINKE Liste, during the European elections 2004 as part of the Party of the European Left.

==== Financial situation ====
After the collapse of communist rule in the German Democratic Republic in 1989, there were long court-proceedings for many years concerning the considerable net assets of the company Novum. Although the company was an East German one, it was used to siphon money and finance the KPÖ, see also Rudolfine Steindling for further details. The company used to be able to make large amounts of money through GDR foreign trade and the protection of the East German Socialist Unity Party (SED), with the profits used almost exclusively to support the KPÖ. As the successor state, the Federal Republic of Germany laid claim to all the finances of Novum, which was hotly contested by the KPÖ. The German courts decided in 2002, that the former SED-company belonged to the state-assets of the GDR, hence to its successor state the unified Germany. Therefore, these net assets of the KPÖ were confiscated. Due to the court decision over the Novum holding, the party lost over 250 million euros of its financial assets. The party saw no alternative but to fire all its employees and stop the production of its weekly newspaper Volksstimme ("Voice of the people", later restarted as Volksstimmen.) The continuing existence of the party depends largely on volunteer work of dedicated communists and sympathisers.

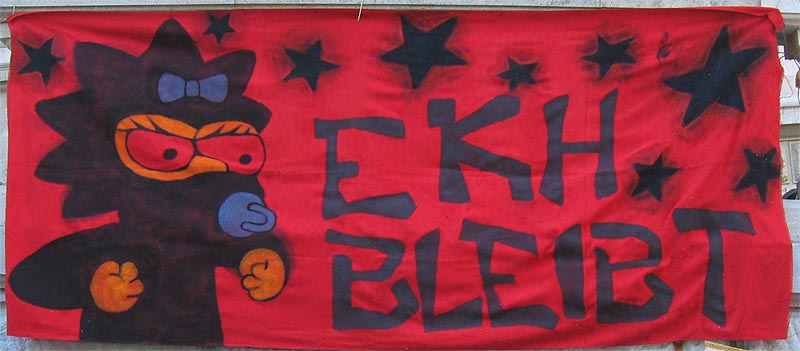
Transparency of an EKH-bleibt-Aktion ("Ernst-Kirchweger-House-remains action"). The banner depicts a bellicose Maggie Simpson in a balaclava

Because of the financial problems, the party had to sell the so-called Ernst-Kirchweger-Haus (EKH), which was occupied by the so-called Autonome (autonomous) activists since 1990. The sale led to substantial criticism from leftists within and outside Austria, being condemned as "capitalistic". Critics accused the KPÖ of not having exhausted all possibilities to avoid the sale. The accusation that the private buyer was a right-wing extremist could, however, not be substantiated.

In January 2005 there were several acts of vandalism against cars and private dwellings of KPÖ functionaries as well as the house of the KPÖ chairman. According to media reports the perpetrators outed themselves through the graffiti as EKH sympathisers. The KPÖ defended itself by arguing it had no possible financial means to keep the house. Previously in 2003 the party tried to convince the city of Vienna to buy the building to save it from privatisation; however, city authorities did not respond.

==== Internal party conflict ====
Beginning in 1994 a conflict between the party leadership revolving around chairman Walter Baier and different internal oppositional groups, who had gathered themselves mainly around the newspaper nVs (neue Volksstimme, English: new Voice of the people) and the internet platform Kominform. Internal party critics accused Walter Baier of revisionism and betrayal of Marxism; he in turn accused them of Stalinist tendencies.

This conflict escalated in 2004, when at a party convention it was decided to enter the Party of the European Left. In the elections to the European Parliament the KPÖ ran in a largely self-financed alliance ("Wahlbündnis LINKS") with Leo Gabriel as the leading candidate. In an interview with the magazine profil, he spoke out against socialism, saying "I want a Europe of solidarity, not a socialist Europe", which sparked furious criticism from the internal party opposition. A further point of contention for the opposition was that the party, in the course of its entry to the European Left Party, had to drop its previous demand of an Austrian withdrawal from the European Union. Many party organisations therefore boycotted the election campaign. The election result of 0.77% (20,497 votes) was disappointing and meant a drop of 1,466 votes compared to the election results of 1999.

The pressure on the party leadership to convene a party congress rose and as a consequence the leadership, which consisted of Walter Baier and two further members, called up the 33rd Party Congress of the KPÖ for the 11 December and 12 December 2004, as a delegation party congress in Linz-Ebelsberg. With this summoning the leadership ignored a resolution of the 32nd Party Congress (which was held as an "all-members" party congress, not by delegates), which stated that the following 33rd Party Congress would again be held as an "all-member" party congress, somewhere outside Vienna. Since the Party Congress is, according to party statute, the highest committee of the KPÖ, the opposition saw a breach of the statute and called upon the arbitration commission of the party, which is the internal authority in such cases. The arbitration commission decided, however, that no formal breach of the statute was recognisable since, according to statute, the Party Congress cannot decide on the form of a future convening party congress. Some members of the KPÖ branch in Ottakring (Ottakring is a traditional low income worker's district in Vienna) tried to convene an all-members party congress of their own, justifying their actions on the statute of the party. This attempt was called off quickly due to threats of legal action from Baier. The delegates Party Congress convened and took place on 4 December and 5 December 2004, with 76 delegates meeting in Ebelsberg. The Party Congress was boycotted by the internal party opposition as well as the KPÖ regional branch in Tyrol, Graz, and Styria. The agenda of the 33rd Party Congress were the rejection of the European constitution and the European Union services guideline, the defence of public property from privatisation, as well as how to celebrate the Austrian jubilee year 2005 (60 years since the end of World War II, 50 years of independence as the Second Republic, 10 years as a member of the European Union).

Walter Baier was re-elected without opposition with 89.4% of the votes. Among other things, the party statute was also changed. Because of the internal conflict, several members of the opposition were expelled from the party. Some critics accused the leadership of undemocratic procedures, and withdrew from the party voluntarily. The relationship to the Communist Youth of Austria - Young Left (KJÖ) was also tense, because of attempts made by the leadership to develop a new youth organisation. In March 2006, Walter Baier resigned from the presidency of the party for personal and political reasons. He was replaced by Mirko Messner, a Carinthian Slovene and longtime party-activist, and Melina Klaus later that month.

=== Revival and reentrance to Styrian Landtag ===
In the 21st century, the party has seen a revival, particularly in the state of Styria. In the election to the Styrian Landtag (state parliament) on 2 October 2005 the KPÖ, with leading candidate Ernest Kaltenegger, were able to win 4 seats (6.34% of the votes.) This was their first return in the Styrian Landtag (or any state parliament) since 1970. The party retained representation in this body since then. In the Styrian capital, Graz, the KPÖ developed into a successful local party (20.75% in the 2005 local council elections). This success was largely attributed to the leadership of popular town councillor Ernest Kaltenegger who raised the profile of housing as a political issue.

The party secured a seat on the city council in 1988, campaigning against rising rents, and the local party established practical support and advice services to assist tenants in dealing with landlords, inspired by a French Communist Party initiative. During the 1990s the KPÖ successfully campaigned for the passage of bill restricting rents in public housing to no more than a third of the tenant's income. At the following election in 1998 the party won four seats on the council and secured a seat on the city senate (the council's executive), which was taken by Kaltenegger, who was appointed to the city housing department: among other measures he was able to ensure that each public housing unit had its own toilet and bathroom. The KPÖ's vote in the next elections in 2003 increased to almost 20 percent. The following year it managed to block an initiative by the other parties on the council to privatise the city's housing stock by collecting over 10,000 signatures to trigger a referendum, in which 96 percent of voters opposed privatisation. Traditionally, at the end of the year the leaders of the Graz KPÖ reveal their accounts. KPÖ councillors are required to earn the average industrial wage and donate the rest to social programmes in accordance with the basic rules of the KPÖ. The party retained this stronghold in 2012 and in 2017. In the 2021 Graz local election held on 26 September, the KPÖ emerged as the party with the most seats on the council, with 29 percent of the vote, and the party's Elke Kahr was subsequently elected mayor at the head of a coalition of the Communists, the Social Democrats and the Greens.

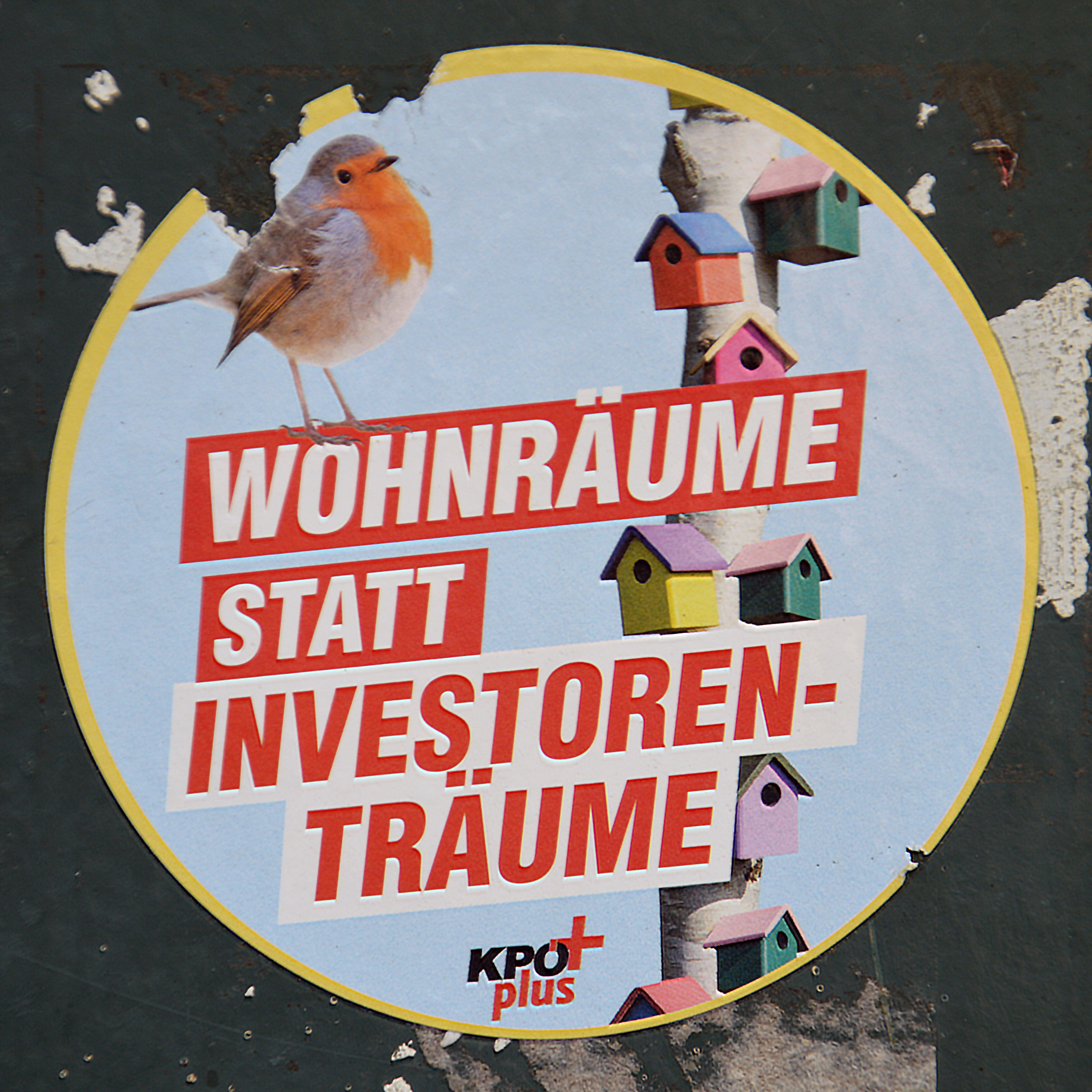
KPÖ sticker advocating for "living spaces instead of investor dreams", seen in Salzburg in 2023.

In the 2023 Salzburg state election, the KPÖ won 11.7% of the vote (an increase of 11.3% from the previous election in 2018) and four seats. This was the first time the party won seats to the Salzburg Landtag since 1945. In the 2024 European Parliament election, the KPÖ more than tripled its result of 2019, gaining 104,245 votes (3,0%). Despite some polls showing the KPÖ above the electoral threshold for a short period in 2023, the party ended up winning 2.4% of the vote in the 2024 Austrian legislative election, and failed to win any seats. This was still a notable improvement from the previous election and the party's best result since 1962. In the 2026 Graz local election held on 29 June, the KPÖ made further gains and won in a landslide with almost 36% of the vote.

== Organization ==
=== Press ===
The party published a newspaper called Volksstimme (English: People's Voice) between 1945 and 1991 and again since a few years. It also published a theoretical monthly journal called Weg und Ziel (English: Path and Destination) until 2000. Another publication which was published by the party was a Czech language newspaper based in Vienna, Průkopník svobody ('Pioneer of Freedom'). It appeared weekly between 1918 and 1926, and bi-weekly 1926–1929.

=== Salary cap ===
Since 1998, elected officials have observed a salary cap set at the wages of a skilled worker. Pay above this amount is donated to people in need. The rationale is to ensure politicians remain attuned to the financial needs of their constituents.

== Popular support ==
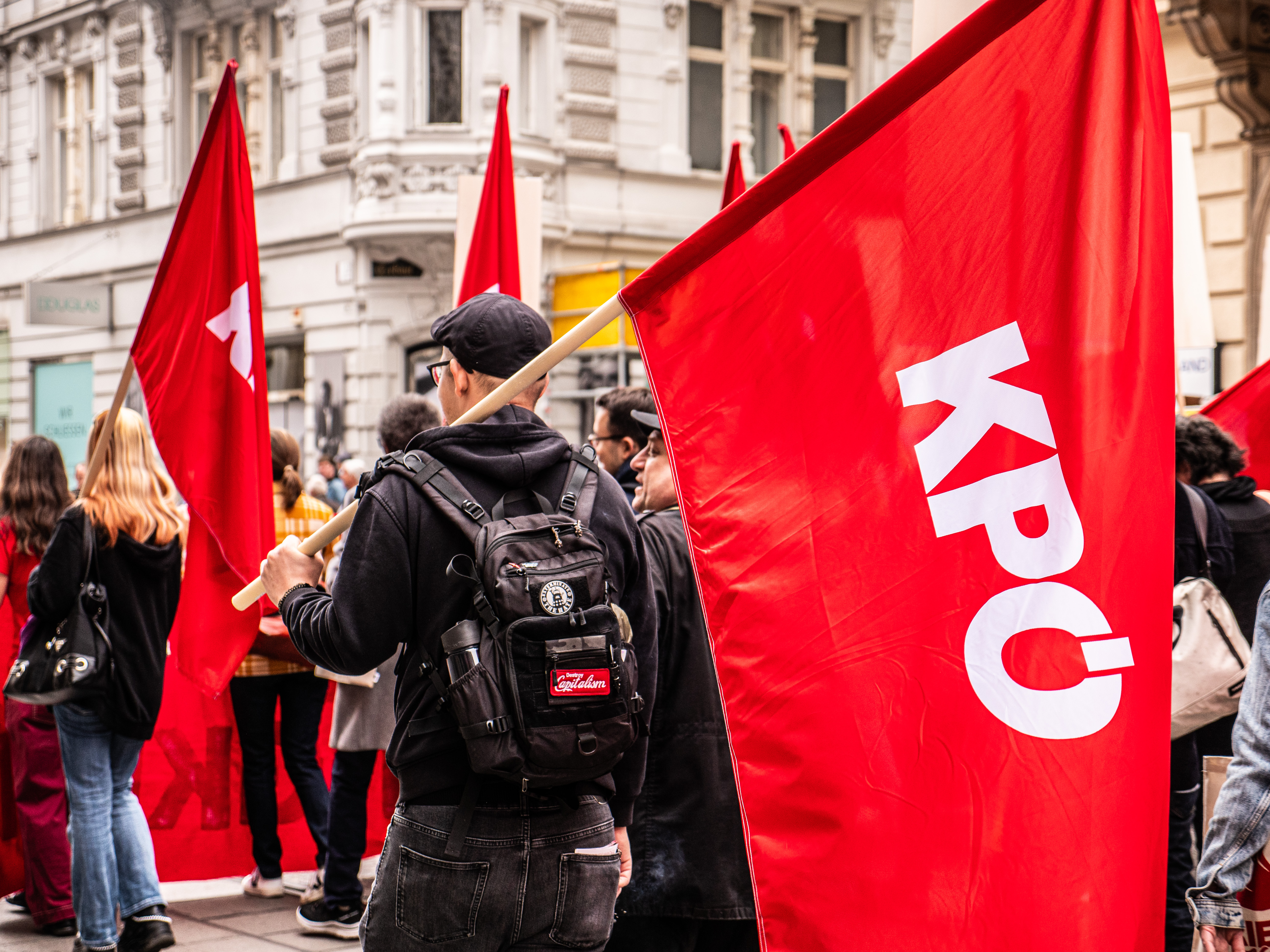
Protesters carrying KPÖ flags during the International Workers' Day demonstration in Styria, 1 May 2024

The party's strongest branch is in Styria, which until the 2023 Salzburg state election was the only state Landtag where the party was represented, and their strongest state in national elections. Within Styria, the KPÖ is particularly strong in Graz, the Styrian capital and the second largest city in Austria, where the KPÖ outpolls the SPÖ and Grüne (20.75% in the 2005 local council elections). The party retained this stronghold in 2012. The KPÖ also retains support in their historical industrial strongholds in Vienna, Lower Austria, and Upper Austria.

The KPÖ is strong with younger voters, doubling up their vote share to 1.47% in the 2005 Vienna state election after the voting age was lowered to 16. For the first time since 1991 the KPÖ had seats in the districts. On 23 October 2005, one mandate each was won in the districts of Leopoldstadt and Landstraße, although not in the state Landtag. In the remaining 21 districts mandates were narrowly missed.

== Election results ==
=== National Council (Nationalrat) ===
Election	Leader	Votes	%	Seats	+/–	Government
1920	Unclear	27,386	0.92 (#6)	0 / 183	New	Extra-parliamentary
1923	Unclear	22,164	0.67 (#7)	0 / 165	0	Extra-parliamentary
1927	Unclear	16,119	0.44 (#6)	0 / 165	0	Extra-parliamentary
1930	Unclear	20,951	0.57 (#7)	0 / 165	0	Extra-parliamentary
1945	Johann Koplenig	174,257	5.42 (#3)	4 / 165	▲4	ÖVP–SPÖ–KPÖ majority
1949	Johann Koplenig	213,066	5.08 (#4)	5 / 165	▲1	Opposition
1953	Johann Koplenig	228,159	5.28 (#4)	4 / 165	▼1	Opposition
1956	Johann Koplenig	192,438	4.42 (#4)	3 / 165	▼1	Opposition
1959	Johann Koplenig	142,578	3.27 (#4)	0 / 165	▼3	Extra-parliamentary
1962	Johann Koplenig	135,520	3.04 (#4)	0 / 165	0	Extra-parliamentary
1966	Franz Muhri	18,636	0.41 (#5)	0 / 165	0	Extra-parliamentary
1970	Franz Muhri	44,750	0.98 (#4)	0 / 165	0	Extra-parliamentary
1971	Franz Muhri	61,762	1.36 (#4)	0 / 183	0	Extra-parliamentary
1975	Franz Muhri	55,032	1.19 (#4)	0 / 183	0	Extra-parliamentary
1979	Franz Muhri	45,280	0.96 (#4)	0 / 183	0	Extra-parliamentary
1983	Franz Muhri	31,912	0.66 (#6)	0 / 183	0	Extra-parliamentary
1986	Franz Muhri	35,104	0.72 (#5)	0 / 183	0	Extra-parliamentary
1990	Walter Silbermayr; Susanne Sohn	25,682	0.55 (#7)	0 / 183	0	Extra-parliamentary
1994	Walter Baier	11,919	0.26 (#7)	0 / 183	0	Extra-parliamentary
1995	Walter Baier	13,938	0.29 (#7)	0 / 183	0	Extra-parliamentary
1999	Walter Baier	22,016	0.48 (#7)	0 / 183	0	Extra-parliamentary
2002	Walter Baier	27,568	0.56 (#6)	0 / 183	0	Extra-parliamentary
2006	Mirko Messner; Melina Klaus	47,578	1.01 (#7)	0 / 183	0	Extra-parliamentary
2008	Mirko Messner; Melina Klaus	37,362	0.76 (#8)	0 / 183	0	Extra-parliamentary
2013	Mirko Messner	48,175	1.03 (#8)	0 / 183	0	Extra-parliamentary
2017 (Note: Run as part of the KPÖ Plus list.)	Mirko Messner	39,689	0.78 (#8)	0 / 183	0	Extra-parliamentary
2019	Mirko Messner	32,736	0.69 (#7)	0 / 183	0	Extra-parliamentary
2024	Günther Hopfgartner	116,891	2.39 (#6)	0 / 183	0	Extra-parliamentary

=== European Parliament ===
Election	List leader	Votes	%	Seats	+/–	EP Group
1996	Walter Baier	1,656	0.47 (#8)	0 / 21	New	–
1999	Unclear	20,497	0.73 (#7)	0 / 21	0	–
2004	Unclear	19,530	0.78 (#6)	0 / 18	0	–
2009	Günther Hopfgartner	18,926	0.66 (#8)	0 / 19	0	–
2014 (Note: Run as part of the Europe Different list (KPÖ, PIRAT and WANDEL).)	Martin Ehrenhauser	60,451	2.14 (#7)	0 / 18	0	–
2019 (Note: Run as part of the KPÖ Plus list.)	Aikaterini Anastasiou	30,087	0.80 (#7)	0 / 18	0	–
2024	Günther Hopfgartner	104,245	2.96 (#6)	0 / 20	0	–

=== State parliaments (Landtage) ===
==== Burgenland ====
Burgenland Landtag
Election year	% of overall vote	# of overall seats won	±
1945	3.3	1 / 32	
1949	2.9	0 / 32	▼1
1953	3.2	1 / 32	▲1
1956	1.9	0 / 32	▼1
1960	1.1	0 / 32	0
1964	0.9	0 / 32	0
1968	0.5	0 / 32	0
1972	0.4	0 / 32	0
1977	0.4	0 / 36	0
1982	0.5	0 / 36	0
1987	0.6	0 / 36	0
Source: Parties and Elections in Europe Archived 2013-07-26 at the Wayback Machine

Note: KPÖ has not contested Landtag elections in Burgenland since 1987.

==== Carinthia ====
Carinthia Landtag
Election year	% of overall vote	# of overall seats won	±
1945	8.1	3 / 36	
1949	4.0	1 / 36	▼2
1953	4.0	1 / 36	0
1956	3.1	1 / 36	0
1960	3.0	1 / 36	0
1965	2.8	1 / 36	0
1970	2.3	0 / 36	▼1
1975	2.0	0 / 36	0
1979	1.0	0 / 36	0
1984	0.8	0 / 36	0
1989	0.6	0 / 36	0
1999	0.4	0 / 36	0
2004	0.6	0 / 36	0
2009	0.5	0 / 36	0
2018	0.28	0 / 36	0
2023	0.12	0 / 36	0
Source: Parties and Elections in Europe Archived 2013-01-28 at the Wayback Machine

Note: KPÖ did not contest the 1994 or 2013 Landtag elections in Carinthia.

==== Lower Austria ====
Lower Austria Landtag
Election year	% of overall vote	# of overall seats won	±
1945	5.2	2 / 56	
1949	5.5	3 / 56	▲1
1954	5.8	3 / 56	0
1959	2.9	0 / 56	▼3
1964	2.4	0 / 56	0
1969	1.0	0 / 56	0
1974	1.0	0 / 56	0
1979	0.8	0 / 56	0
1983	0.8	0 / 56	0
1988	0.8	0 / 56	0
1993	0.2	0 / 56	0
1998	0.6	0 / 56	0
2003	0.8	0 / 56	0
2008	0.9	0 / 56	0
2013	0.8	0 / 56	0
2023	0.38	0 / 56	0
Source: Parties and Elections in Europe Archived 2013-07-26 at the Wayback Machine

Note: KPÖ did not contest the 2018 Landtag elections in Lower Austria.

==== Salzburg ====
Salzburg Landtag
Election year	% of overall vote	# of overall seats won	±
1945	3.8	1 / 36	
1949	3.4	0 / 36	▼1
1954	2.3	0 / 36	0
1959	1.8	0 / 36	0
1964	1.2	0 / 36	0
1969	0.7	0 / 36	0
1974	1.2	0 / 36	0
1979	0.4	0 / 36	0
1984	0.5	0 / 36	0
1989	0.5	0 / 36	0
2013	0.3	0 / 36	0
2018	0.4	0 / 36	0
2023	11.7	4 / 36	▲4
Source: Parties and Elections in Europe Archived 2013-07-26 at the Wayback Machine

Note: KPÖ did not contest Landtag elections in Salzburg between 1989 and 2013.

==== Styria ====
Styria Landtag
Election year	% of overall vote	# of overall seats won	±
1945	5.4	2 / 48	
1949	4.5	1 / 48	▼1
1953	4.4	1 / 48	0
1957	2.6	0 / 48	▼1
1961	3.8	1 / 48	▲1
1965	3.2	1 / 56	0
1970	1.3	0 / 56	▼1
1974	1.4	0 / 56	0
1978	1.3	0 / 56	0
1981	1.3	0 / 56	0
1986	1.2	0 / 56	0
1991	0.6	0 / 56	0
1995	0.6	0 / 56	0
2000	1.0	0 / 56	0
2005	6.34	4 / 56	▲4
2010	4.41	2 / 56	▼2
2015	4.22	2 / 48	0
2019	5.99	2 / 48	0
2024	4.47	2 / 48	0
Source: Parties and Elections in Europe Archived 2013-07-26 at the Wayback Machine

==== Tyrol ====
Tyrol Landtag
Election year	% of overall vote	# of overall seats won	±
1945	2.2	0 / 36	
1949	1.6	0 / 36	0
1953	1.6	0 / 36	0
1957	0.8	0 / 36	0
1961	1.0	0 / 36	0
1970	0.2	0 / 36	0
1975	0.6	0 / 36	0
1979	0.4	0 / 36	0
1984	0.4	0 / 36	0
1989	0.6	0 / 36	0
1999	0.1	0 / 36	0
2003	0.7	0 / 36	0
2008	1.2	0 / 36	0
2013	0.5	0 / 36	0
2022	0.67	0 / 36	0
Source: Parties and Elections in Europe Archived 2013-07-26 at the Wayback Machine

Note: KPÖ did not contest the 1965 or 1994 Landtag elections in Tyrol.

==== Upper Austria ====
Upper Austria Landtag
Election year	% of overall vote	# of overall seats won	±
1945	2.6	0 / 48	
1949	3.1	0 / 48	0
1955	2.8	0 / 48	0
1961	1.9	0 / 48	0
1967	0.5	0 / 48	0
1973	0.9	0 / 46	0
1979	0.6	0 / 46	0
1985	0.7	0 / 46	0
1997	0.3	0 / 46	0
2003	0.8	0 / 46	0
2009	0.6	0 / 46	0
2015	0.8	0 / 46	0
2021	0.8	0 / 46	0
Source: Parties and Elections in Europe Archived 2013-07-26 at the Wayback Machine

Note: KPÖ did not contest the 1991 Landtag elections in Upper Austria.

==== Vienna ====
Vienna Landtag
Election year	% of overall vote	# of overall seats won	±
1945	8.0	6 / 100	
1949	7.9	7 / 100	▲1
1954	8.2	6 / 100	▼1
1959	5.2	3 / 100	▼3
1964	5.0	2 / 100	▼1
1969	2.9	0 / 100	▼2
1973	2.3	0 / 100	0
1978	1.8	0 / 100	0
1983	1.1	0 / 100	0
1987	1.7	0 / 100	0
1991	0.6	0 / 100	0
1996	0.6	0 / 100	0
2001	0.6	0 / 100	0
2005	1.5	0 / 100	0
2010	1.12	0 / 100	0
2015	1.07	0 / 100	0
2020	2.06	0 / 100	0
2025	4.06	0 / 100	0
Source: Parties and Elections in Europe Archived 2013-07-26 at the Wayback Machine

Note: KPÖ contested the 2015 Vienna elections as part of the Wien anders coalition, and the 2020 Vienna elections as part of the LINKS coalition.

==== Vorarlberg ====
Vorarlberg Landtag
Election year	% of overall vote	# of overall seats won	±
1945	2.5	0 / 26	
1949	2.4	0 / 26	0
1954	2.4	0 / 26	0
1959	1.1	0 / 26	0
1964	1.2	0 / 36	0
1969	1.3	0 / 36	0
1974	0.9	0 / 36	0
1979	1.0	0 / 36	0
1984	0.9	0 / 36	0
1989	0.7	0 / 100	0
2024	0.75	0 / 100	0
Source: Parties and Elections in Europe Archived 2013-07-26 at the Wayback Machine

Note: KPÖ did not contest Landtag elections in Vorarlberg from 1989 until 2024.

=== European Parliament ===
European Parliament
Election year	# of overall votes	% of overall vote	# of overall seats won	±
1996	17,656	0.5	0 / 21	
1999	20,497	0.7	0 / 21	0
2004	19,530	0.8 (Note: In 2004 KPÖ contested the European Parliament elections with European Left and independents as Opposition for a Europe of Solidarity.)	0 / 18	0
2009	18,926	0.7	0 / 17	0
2014	60,451	2.1 (Note: In 2014 KPÖ contested the European Parliament elections with Pirate Party of Austria, Der Wandel and independents as Europe Different.)	0 / 18	0
2019	30,086	0.8	0 / 18	0
2024	104,245	3.0	0 / 18	0

== Party chairpersons since 1945 ==
The chart below shows a timeline of the communist chairpersons and the Chancellors of Austria. The left bar shows all the chairpersons (Bundesparteivorsitzende, abbreviated as "CP") of the KPÖ, and the right bar shows the corresponding make-up of the Austrian government at that time. The red (Social Democratic Party) and black (Austrian People's Party) colours correspond to which party led the federal government (Bundesregierung, abbreviated as "Govern."). The last names of the respective chancellors are shown, the Roman numeral stands for the cabinets.

== See also ==
- Communist Youth of Austria
- Communist Workers Party (Austria)
- Elections in Austria
- List of political parties in Austria
