= Maria Kalergis =

Polish-German noblewoman (1822–1874)

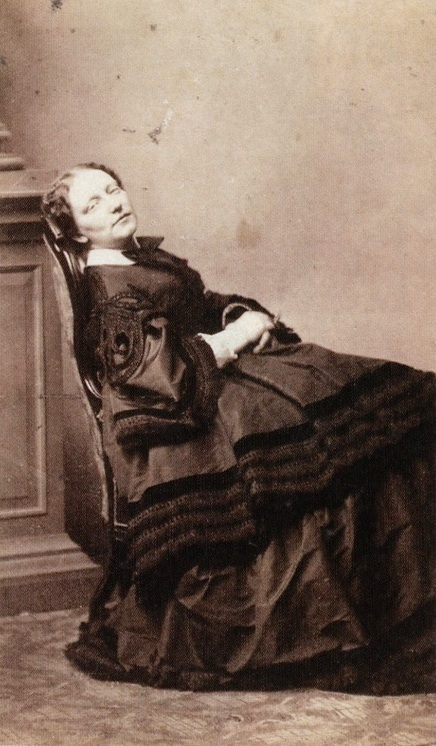
- Portrait of Kalergis by Karol Beyer from the collections of the Theatre Museum
- Born: Maria von Nesselrode-Ehreshoven; 7 August 1822; Warsaw, Mazowsze Voivodeship, Congress Poland
- Died: 22 May 1874 (aged 51); Warsaw, Warsaw Governorate, Congress Poland
- Resting place: Powązki Cemetery
- Children: Marie Kalergi
- Relatives: Heinrich von Coudenhove-Kalergi
- Family: Górski; Kallergis; Nesselrode

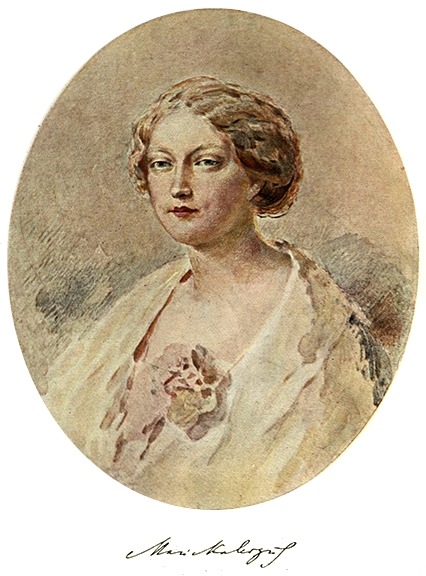
Countess Maria von Nesselrode-Ehreshoven

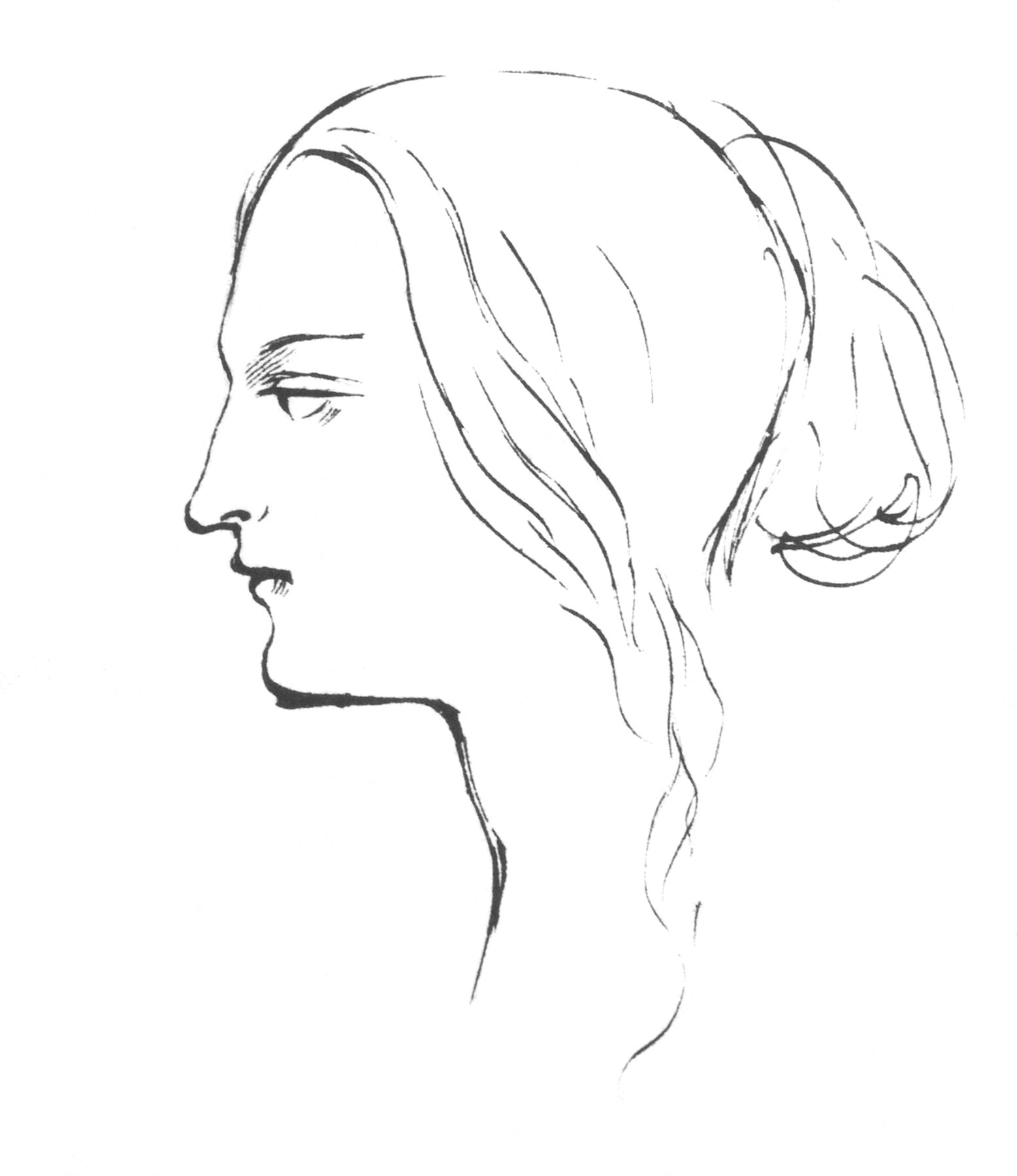
Cyprian Norwid, Maria Kalergis, 1845

Maria Kalergis von Nesselrode-Ereshoven (7 August 1822 Warsaw – 22 May 1874, Warsaw) was a Polish-German noblewoman, pianist, salon hostess and patron of the arts.

== Life ==
Countess Maria von Nesselrode-Ehreshoven was the daughter of the German count in the Russian service, Karl Friedrich Joseph von Nesselrode-Ehreshoven (1786-1868), and his wife, Polish noblewoman Tekla von Górska (1793-1851). At the age of seventeen Maria von Nesselrode married Jan Kalergis, a rich landowner of Greek Cretan noble descent, who was much older and proved to be of a jealous disposition. Although they had a daughter, Marie, born in Saint Petersburg in 1840, less than a year after their wedding they agreed to separate. Despite several attempts to overcome their aversion towards each other, they continued living separately, without divorcing, until Jan's death. He ensured Maria had a comfortable life. While the division of their assets was in dispute, she was able to tour Europe, including Saint Petersburg, Warsaw, Paris and Baden-Baden.

The course of Maria's marriage was an echo of her own childhood experiences. A year after her birth, her father, Friedrich Karl von Nesselrode, a German and his wife Thekla, a Pole, had separated due to personality differences. From her sixth year, Maria had been raised in Saint Petersburg in the home of her paternal uncle, Count Karl Robert von Nesselrode-Ehreshoven, a German in the Russian court who for forty years (1816–56) was the Tsar's minister of foreign affairs and who saw to it that Maria received a thorough education.

She evinced an early musical talent and for a while took lessons from Chopin, who praised her musical abilities. She was taught Polish by her mother and also spoke French, as well as German, English, Italian and Russian.

She is remembered as the great love of Cyprian Norwid, the leading Polish romantic poet. Her acquaintance with the young Pole was but one of many episodes in an active social life. Owing to his shyness and relatively modest means he was overshadowed by Maria's other admirers. For many years Norwid harboured unrequited feelings for her that were a source of his poetic inspiration. He confided them in letters to Maria Trembicka, later Faleńska, daughter of General Stanisław Trembicki, and a close friend of the "white siren", as Maria was known. Encouraged by his confidante's friendship, he proposed to Maria Kalergis but was rejected.

From 1847 she lived in Paris, then from 1857 in Warsaw. Guests at her salons included Liszt, Richard Wagner who addressed his infamous essay Das Judentum in der Musik to her, de Musset, Moniuszko, Gautier, Heine who dedicated his poem "The White Elephant" to her and Fryderyk Chopin. In Warsaw she became a hostess and a patron of the arts and took part in charity fund-raising concerts and theatrical performances. Her resources were always available to those in need.

When Stanisław Moniuszko wanted to premiere the four-act version of his opera Halka in Warsaw, he was initially opposed by the Russian administrator in charge of Warsaw theatres, Siergiej Muchanow, who also happened to be the Warsaw chief of police and, later in 1863 became Maria's second husband. Thanks to Maria's intervention, Moniuszko managed to stage his opera. Three months after its January 1858 opening, she organized a benefit concert for Moniuszko, who was in constant financial difficulties. The concert raised 25,000 Polish złoty, which enabled the composer to meet his immediate needs and take a trip abroad.

Maria Kalergis had an appreciable influence on the development of musical culture in Warsaw. She was a co-founder of the Warsaw Musical Institute, now the Warsaw Conservatory and, with Moniuszko established the Warsaw Musical Society, now the Warsaw Philharmonic. Between 1857 and 1871 she made frequent appearances as a pianist.

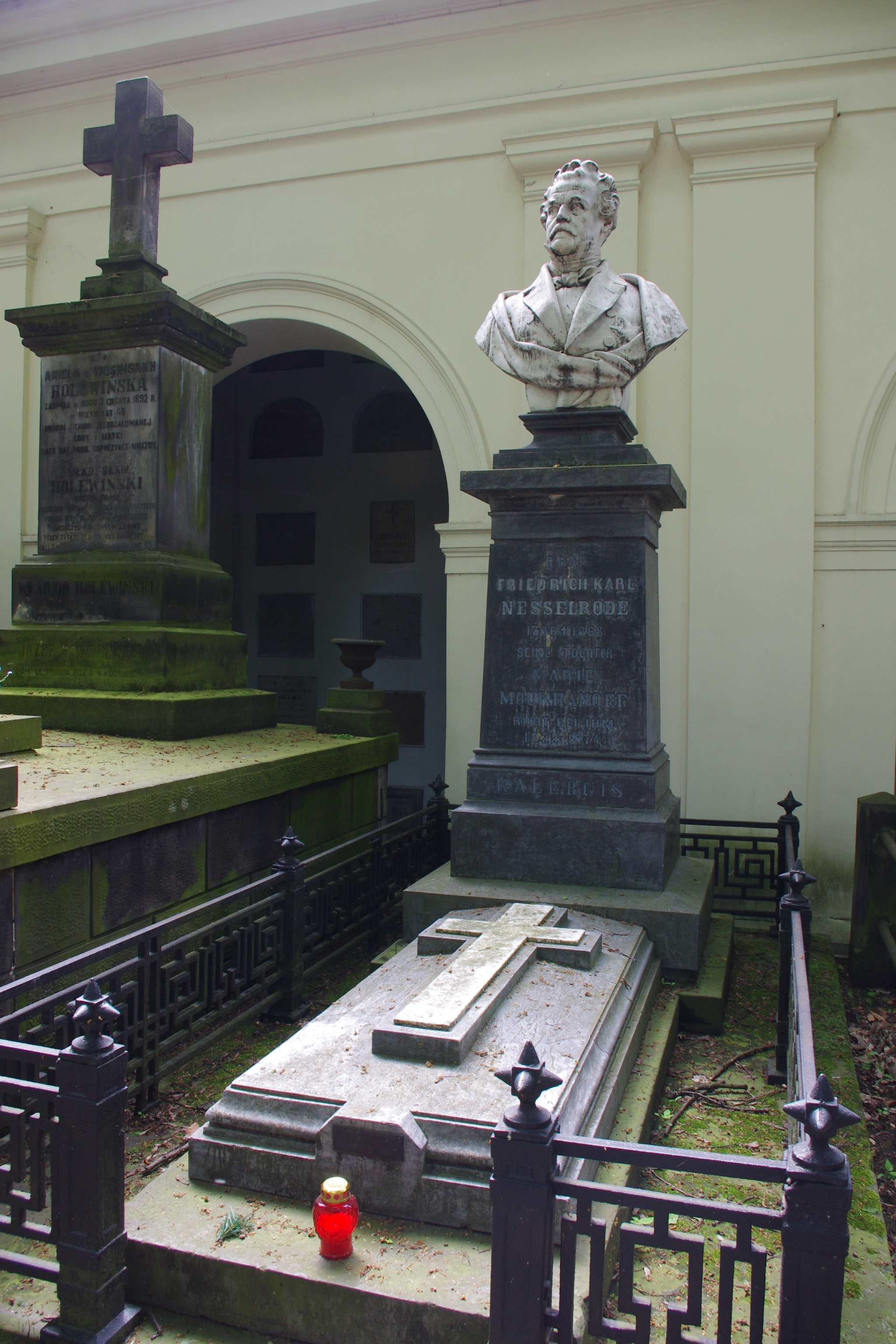
The tomb of Maria Kalergis along with her father Count von Nesselrode, in the Powązki Cemetery, Warsaw

Soon after her first husband's death in 1863, she married Muchanow, ten years her junior. He was with her during her illness and nursed her devotedly through her final days. It was probably then that, sensing the approaching end of her life, Maria destroyed her correspondence. However, her letters to her daughter, son-in-law and friends have survived, and have made it possible to reconstruct many facts about her life and are a valuable source about the period. She was interred next to her father at Warsaw's Powązki Cemetery. On her death, Liszt wrote his Elegy on Marie Kalergi.

== Descendants ==
With Emperor Franz Josef's permission, Maria Kalergis' grandson, Heinrich von Coudenhove, was allowed to alter his surname to Coudenhove-Calergi, as a tribute to his famous grandmother. He married a Japanese noblewoman, Mitsuko Aoyama. In 1923 their son, Count Richard von Coudenhove-Kalergi, founded the Paneuropean Union.
