= Coudenhove-Kalergi family =

Bohemian noble family

Coudenhove-Kalergi
- Parent house: Coudenhove (paternal line); Kallergis (maternal line)
- Founded: 1857 (marriage); 1903 (name change)
- Founder: Heinrich von Coudenhove-Kalergi
- Titles: Count of Coudenhove-Kalergi von Ronspergheim (awarded in 1918)

The Coudenhove-Kalergi family is an Austro-Bohemian noble family of mixed Flemish and Cretan Greek descent, which was formed by the marriage of Count Franz Karl von Coudenhove (1825–1893) with Marie Kalergi (1840–1877) in 1857.

The Coudenhoves were Catholic barons with estates in the Prince-Bishopric of Liège and the Lower Rhine region and were raised to the rank of counts of the Holy Roman Empire in 1790. After the upheaval of the French Revolution and the Napoleonic Wars, they moved to the Austrian Empire and acquired estates in the Lands of the Bohemian Crown.

The Kallergis family had enjoyed high status in Crete, having been sent there by Byzantine emperor Alexios II Komnenos in the mid-12th century. They remained there during the Venetian occupation (1204–1669) and subsequently moved to the Venetian-held Ionian Islands. Their palazzo in Venice, the Ca' Vendramin Calergi, is still standing.

The family's most prominent scion was Richard von Coudenhove-Kalergi, a pioneer of European integration and founder of the Paneuropean Union.

== History ==
Arms of the Counts of Coudenhove

The Coudenhove family dates back to the Duchy of Brabant nobleman Gerolf I de Coudenhove (died 1259). After the religious conflicts of the 16th and 17th centuries, the Catholic family moved southwards to the Prince-Bishopric of Liège, acquiring the estate of Fraiture (now in the Belgian province of Liège) in 1661. By the marriage of Maximilian François de Coudenhove (1700–1742) and baroness Maria Adolphina Reuschenberg, the family also inherited the estate of Setterich (near Aachen) in the Duchy of Jülich. Their eldest son George Louis de Coudenhove (1734–1786) married the countess Sophie von Hatzfeldt (1747–1825). She was a close confidante and counsellor of her uncle Friedrich Karl Joseph von Erthal, archbishop and prince-elector of Mainz. Sophie provided for her family's social advancement and was awarded the rank of Imperial Count (Reichsgraf) for herself and her four sons in 1790.

The social and political system in Central Europe was in upheaval after the French Revolution. The Holy Roman Empire was dissolved in 1806, the prominent position of imperial counts was mediatised and ecclesiastical states like the prince-archbishopric of Mainz were secularised. The family's previous status was therefore obsolete. During the Napoleonic Wars, three of Sophie's four sons moved to the Austrian Empire, taking up positions in the military, imperial household, Catholic clergy and the Order of Malta. The eldest son, Carl (1774–1838), sold the acres in Setterich in 1813 and acquired the estate of Jindice (Inditz) in central Bohemia instead, marking the family's relocation from the Rhineland to the Habsburg monarchy.

The Kallergis family is a Cretan Greek noble family originating from the 11th or 12th century, which claims descent from the Byzantine Emperor Nikephoros II Phokas. During the Venetian rule over Crete, the Kallergis family was one of the most important Greek Orthodox families on the island. Richard von Coudenhove-Kalergi describes in his book An idea conquers the world the Kallergis name is composed of the Greek word kalon (=beautiful) and ergon (from ergō="work, task, deed, accomplishment, or purpose") [Greek: Καλλ(ι)έργης > Καλλέργης, known in many versions as Kalergis, Calergis, Kallergi, Callergi, Calergi]. Over the centuries, Polish, Norwegian, Baltic, French, and German lineages were absorbed into the Kallergis family.

The two families united when, on 27 June 1857 in Paris, Count Franz Karl von Coudenhove (1825–1893) married Marie Kalergi (1840–1877), only daughter of Polish pianist Maria Nesselrode and her husband, Jan Kalergis. The lands thus combined included the Zamato estate in the Carinthian mountains, the castle of Ottensheim in Upper Austria, and the Ronsperg (Czech: Poběžovice) estate and castle in western Bohemia.

Franz and Marie had six children, including Heinrich, the first count to use the double-barrelled name. In 1917 when Heinrich's eldest son, Johannes Evangelist Virgilio Coudenhove-Kalergi, was 24 years old, he asked Emperor Charles I of Austria to give him the title Coudenhove-Kalergi of Ronspergheim (von Ronspergheim), and the Emperor granted this request.

== Family members ==
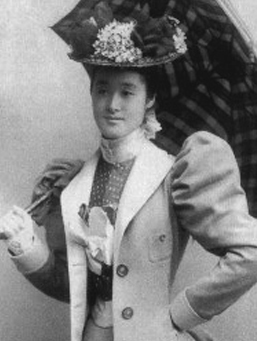
Mitsuko Aoyama

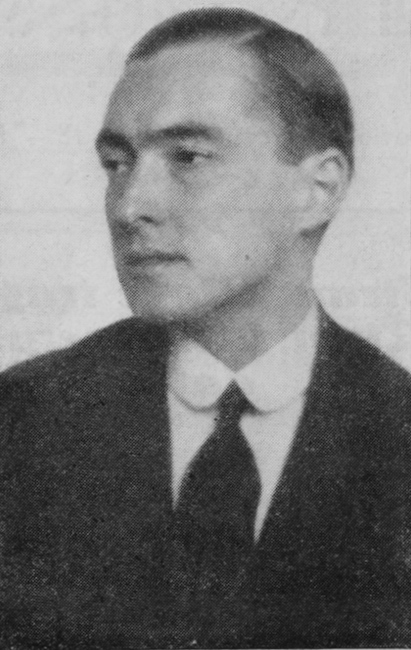
Count Richard Nikolaus von Coudenhove-Kalergi

- Count Heinrich von Coudenhove-Kalergi (1859–1906), who married Mitsuko Aoyama and had:
  - Johannes Evangelist Virgilio Coudenhove-Kalergi von Ronspergheim (1893–1965), author of the cannibalism novel Ich fraß die weiße Chinesin (I ate the white Chinese) by the pen name Duca di Centigloria.
    - Marie-Electa Thekla Elisabeth Christine Helene Sophie "Marina" Coudenhove-Kalergi von Ronspergheim (1927–2000), daughter of Johannes and his first wife Lilly. Married in Phoenix, Arizona in 1954. Died in Los Angeles in 2000.
  - Count Richard Nikolaus von Coudenhove-Kalergi (1894–1972), Austrian writer, politician and founder of the International Paneuropean Union
  - Gerolf Coudenhove-Kalergi / Count Gerolf von Coudenhove-Kalergi (1896–1978)
    - Hans-Heinrich Richard Gerolf Karl Urban Maria Omnes Sancti Coudenhove-Kalergi (born 1926)
      - Sophia Bowie Marie Coudenhove-Kalergi (born 1970)
      - Dominik Cornelius Valentin Gerolf Eugene Coudenhove-Kalergi (born 1973), in 2009 he married Princess Adelheid Marie Beatrice Zita of Liechtenstein (born 1981).
    - Karl Jakob Maria Coudenhove-Kalergi (born 1928)
    - Barbara Coudenhove-Kalergi (born 1932), Czech-Austrian journalist, Gerold's daughter
    - Michael Coudenhove-Kalergi (born 1937), painter
  - Elisabeth Maria Anna Coudenhove-Kalergi (1898–1936), secretary of Engelbert Dollfuss
  - Olga Marietta Henriette Maria Coudenhove-Kalergi (1900–1976)
  - Ida Friederike Görres (1901–1971), sixth child of Heinrich von Coudenhove-Kalergi, Catholic author
  - Karl Heinrich Franz Maria Coudenhove-Kalergi (1903–1987)

== Ancestors and branch lines ==
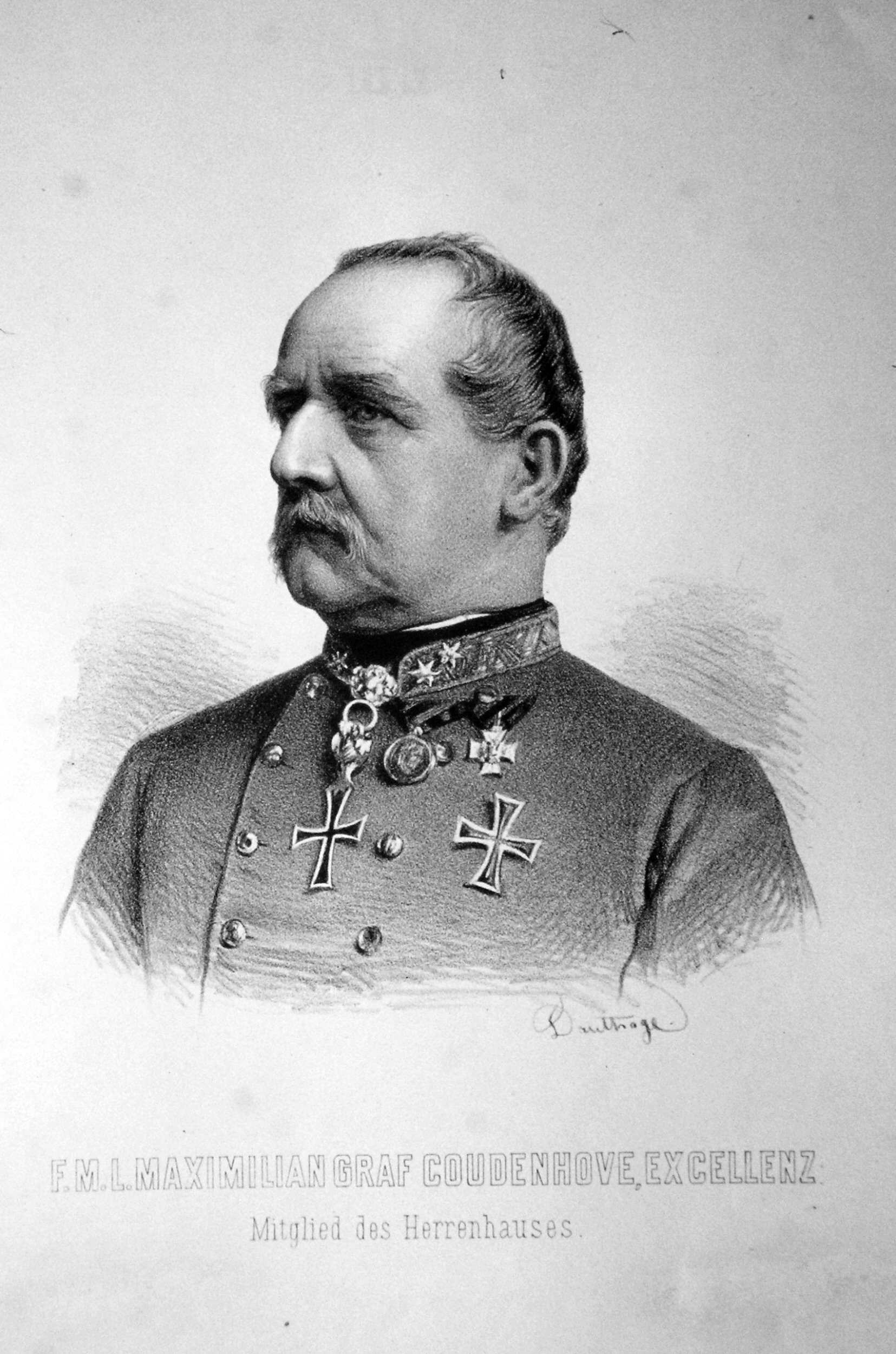
Maximilian von Coudenhove

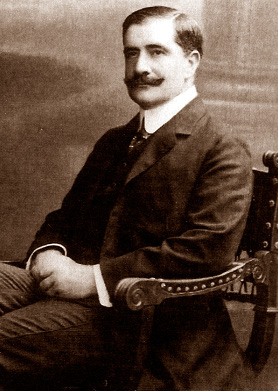
Max von Coudenhove

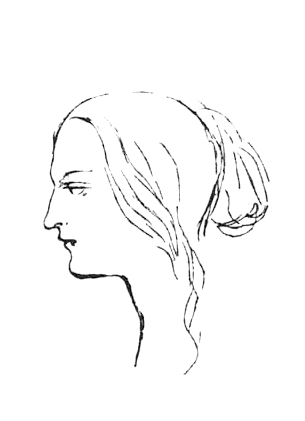
Marie Nesselrode

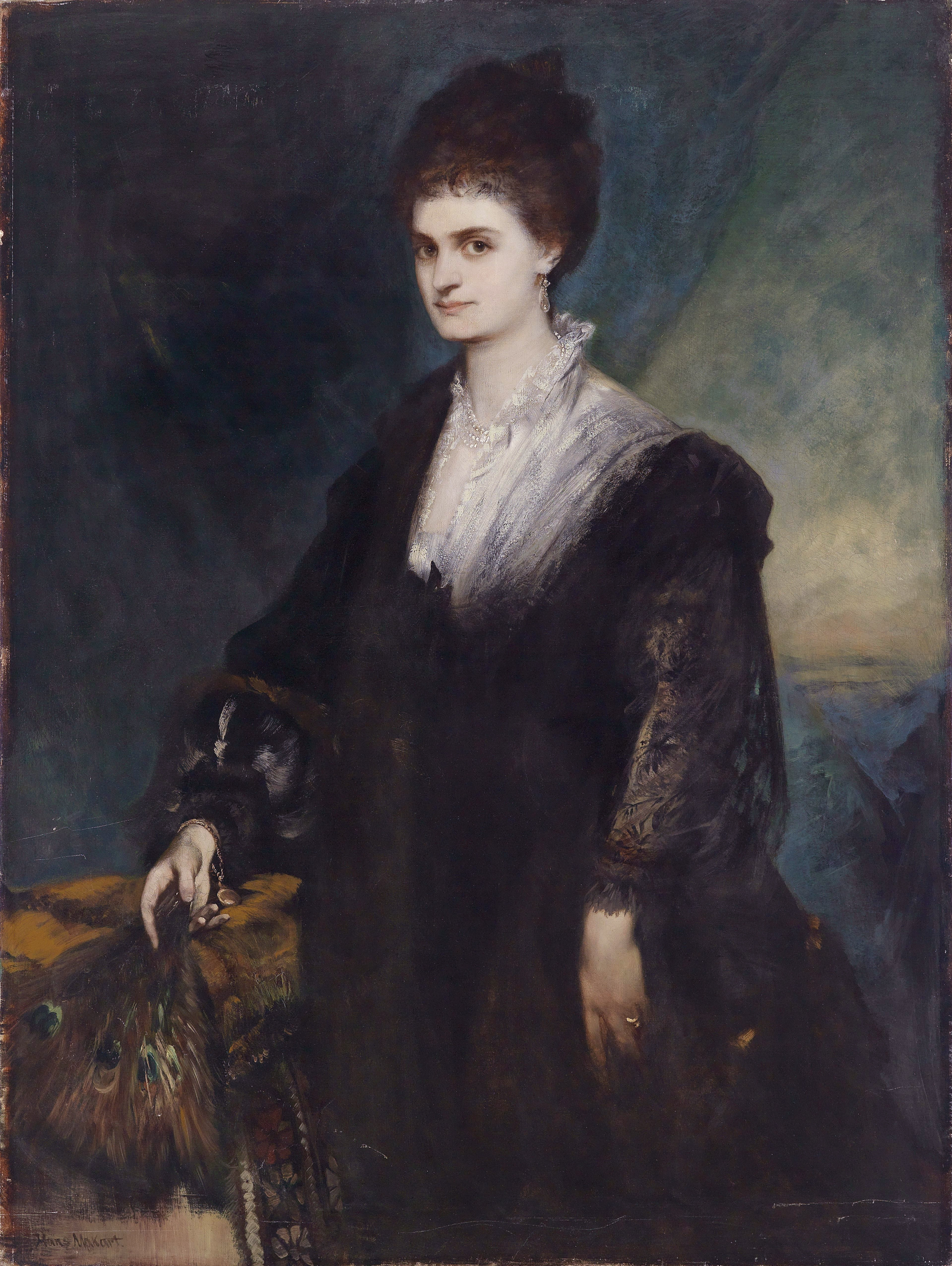
Marie Kalergi

=== Coudenhove family ===
- Franz Ludwig von Coudenhove (1783−1851), Austrian general, aide-de-camp of Austrian Archduke Charles, head of the household of Archduke Louis; grandfather of Heinrich von Coudenhove-Kalergi
- Maximilian von Coudenhove (1805−1889), Austrian general, member of the Austrian House of Lords, first cousin of Heinrich von Coudenhove-Kalergi's father
- Franz Karl von Coudenhove (1825–1893), Austrian diplomat, member of the Austrian House of Lords; father of Heinrich von Coudenhove-Kalergi
- Karl Maria von Coudenhove (1855–1913), Austrian jurist and senior official, governor of Silesia and Bohemia; second cousin of Heinrich von Coudenhove-Kalergi
- Max von Coudenhove (1865–1928), Austrian jurist and senior official, governor of Silesia and Bohemia; second cousin of Heinrich von Coudenhove-Kalergi

=== Kalergis family ===
- Maria Kalergis née Nesselrode (1822–1874), pianist and patronne having a relationship with many famous people: Heine, Balzac, Chateaubriand, Musset, Mérimée, Delacroix, Richard Wagner, Liszt, Chopin; wife of Jan Kalergis
  - Marie Kalergi (1840–1877), mother of Heinrich von Coudenhove-Kalergi
