= Terrenoire (surname) =

Terrenoire or Terrenoir is a surname of French origin.

== List of people with the surname ==
- Alain Terrenoire (born 1941), French lawyer and politician
- Anne Stambach-Terrenoir (born 1980), French politician
- Louis Terrenoire, French politician

== See also ==
- Terre Noire, Nova Scotia
- Terret noir
