= Samuel Kauders =

Bohemian rabbi

Samuel Judah Löb Kauders

Personal life
- Born: 1766 Bechyne, Bohemia
- Died: 6 May 1838 (aged 71–72)

Religious life
- Religion: Judaism
- Denomination: Orthodox Judaism

Jewish leader
- Predecessor: Samuel Landau
- Successor: Solomon Judah Loeb Rapoport
- Position: Oberjurist of Prague
- Began: 1834
- Ended: 1838

Samuel Judah Löb ben David Kauders (Yiddish: שמואל יהודה ליב בן דוד קוידער, romanized: Shemuʼel Yehuda Leyb ben Daṿid Ḳoyder; 1766 – 6 May 1838) was a Bohemian rabbi.

== Biography ==
Kauders was born in Bechyne, Bohemia, in 1766, the son of David Kauders. At the age of 10, he went to study under Michael Bacharach in Prague, and at the age of 13, became a student of Elazar Fleckeles and a friend of Bezalel Ronsburg. After completing his studies, he devoted his time to Talmudics without holding a rabbinical position.

In 1817, he was called to Kaladei as district rabbi of Tabor and Budweis. Between 1824 and 1827, he was also responsible for the Prachin district. In 1834, Kauders succeeded Samuel Landau as Oberjurist (acting chief rabbi) of Prague, a position which he held until his death.

While a Talmudist of the old school and rigorously Orthodox, he was tolerant in his views and favored secular education.

== Publications ==
- Olat Shmuel. Prague. 1823. Responsa on Shulḥan Arukh, Oraḥ Ḥayyim, of which the first part only, containing 112 responsa, was published.
- Pe'ullat Emet. Prague. 1828–1829. Halakhic essays in two parts.
- Ahavat Emet. Prague. 1829. Homilies and essays.
