= Marie Kalergi (1840–1877) =

Austrian noblewoman of Greek descent (1840-1877)

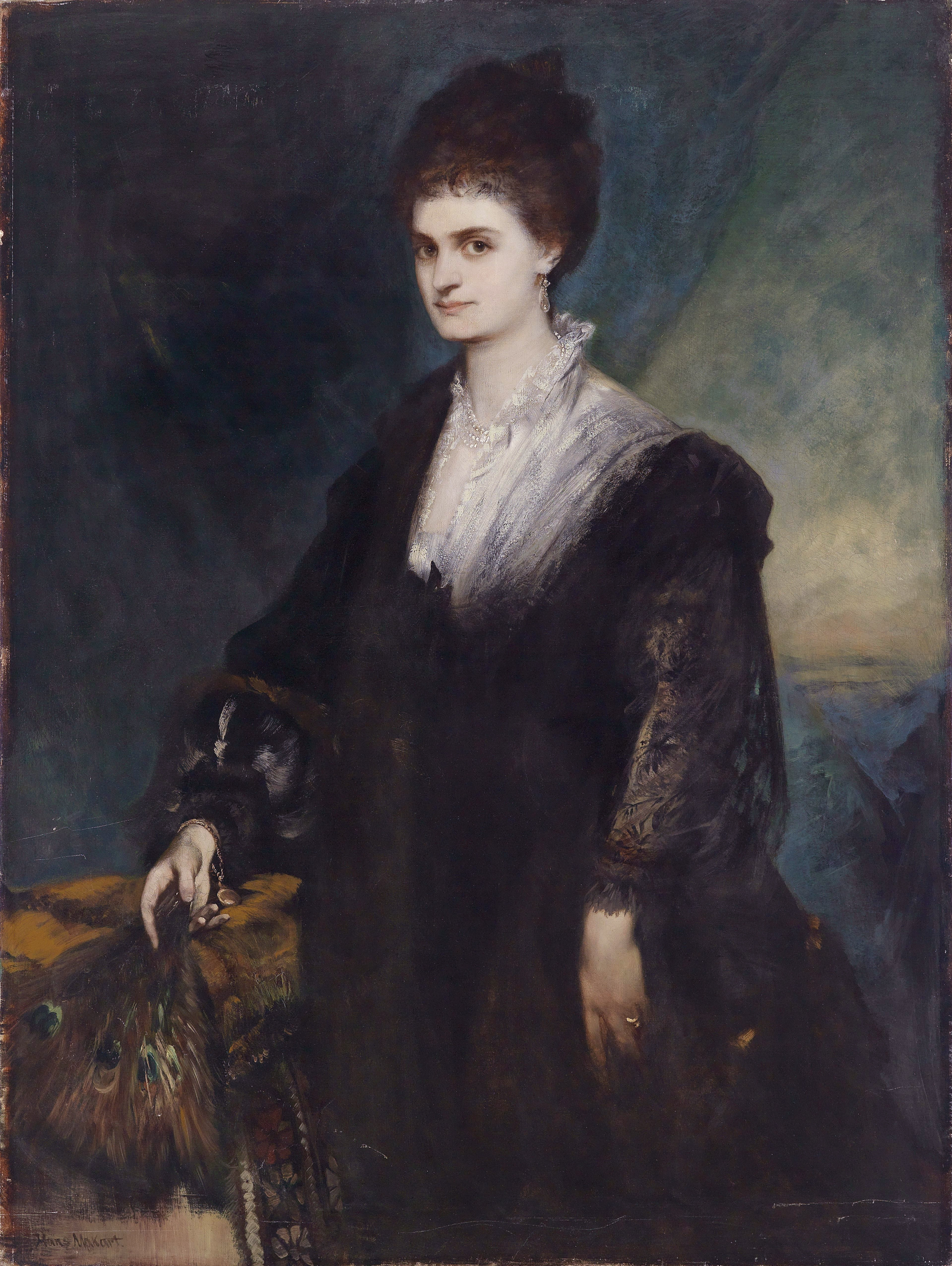
Countess Marie von Coudenhove-Kalergi, painted by Hans Makart in the second half of the 19th century

Marie Kalergi (16 January 1840 – 11 March 1877) was an Austrian noblewoman of Greek descent.

== Biography ==
Born in Saint Petersburg, she was the daughter of Jan Kalergi, of the Greek Kallergis family of Crete, and the pianist Countess Marie von Nesselrode-Ehreshoven. Kalergi was married on June 27, 1857 in Paris to Franz Karl von Coudenhove (1825-1893), founding the Coudenhove-Kalergi family. Their children were:

- Heinrich Johann Marie Coudenhove-Kalergi (born 12 October 1859), founding the surname "Coudenhove-Kalergi" in 1903;
- Friedrich Coudenhove-Kalergi (born 9 January 1861);
- Johann Dominik Maria Coudenhove-Kalergi (born 7 January 1863);
- Maria Thekla Walburga Franzisca Coudenhove-Kalergi (born 31 May 1865);
- Richard Joseph Franz Maria Coudenhove-Kalergi (born 8 May 1867);
- Marietta Anna Sophie Viktorie Coudenhove-Kalergi (born 26 October 1874).

Countess Marie von Coudenhove-Kalergi died, aged 37, at Ronsperg.
