= Lilly Steinschneider =

First Hungarian woman to qualify as a pilot

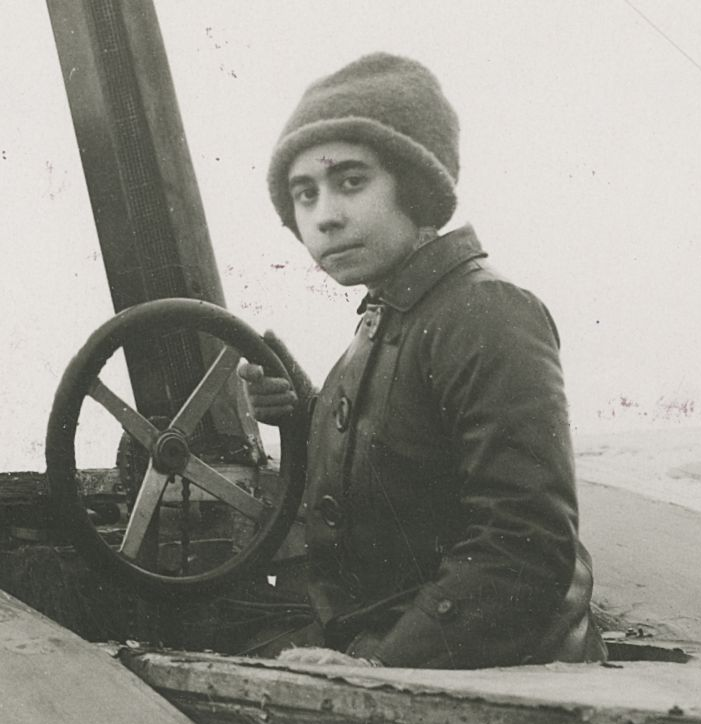
- Born: 13 January 1891; Budapest, Austria-Hungary
- Died: 28 March 1975 (aged 84); Geneva, Switzerland
- Occupation: Pilot
- Spouse: Johann Graf Coudenhove-Kalergi (m. 1914)

Lilly Helene Steinschneider-Wenckheim (13 January 1891 – 28 March 1975), more commonly known as Lilly Steinschneider, was the first Hungarian woman to qualify as a pilot.

== Early life ==
Lilly Steinschneider was born in Budapest on 13 January 1891, the second child of Irma Wohr and Bernát Steinschneider, a wealthy Austrian-Hungarian-Jewish family. Her father owned of a quilt factory which provided quilt covers for the House of Habsburg in Austria, and her mother had Czech origins. Lilly was the second child born in the Steinschneider family, with an older brother called Hugó. Little is known about the first eighteen years of her life.

When Louis Bleriot flew over Budapast in 1909, Steinshneider was inspired to learn to fly. In 1911, as part of her preparation, she earned her driving license in six weeks, having pawned some of her jewellery to find the 200 crowns to cover her costs.

== Flying career ==
Steinschneider learned to fly from flying instructor Karl Illner in Wiener Neustadt, initially shadowing pilots as a passenger before taking the controls herself. Her parents offered some initial financial support if she remained under the supervision of a "French lady companion". Rebelling against this, Steinshneider got a job, but found it difficult to make ends meet as aviation was expensive.

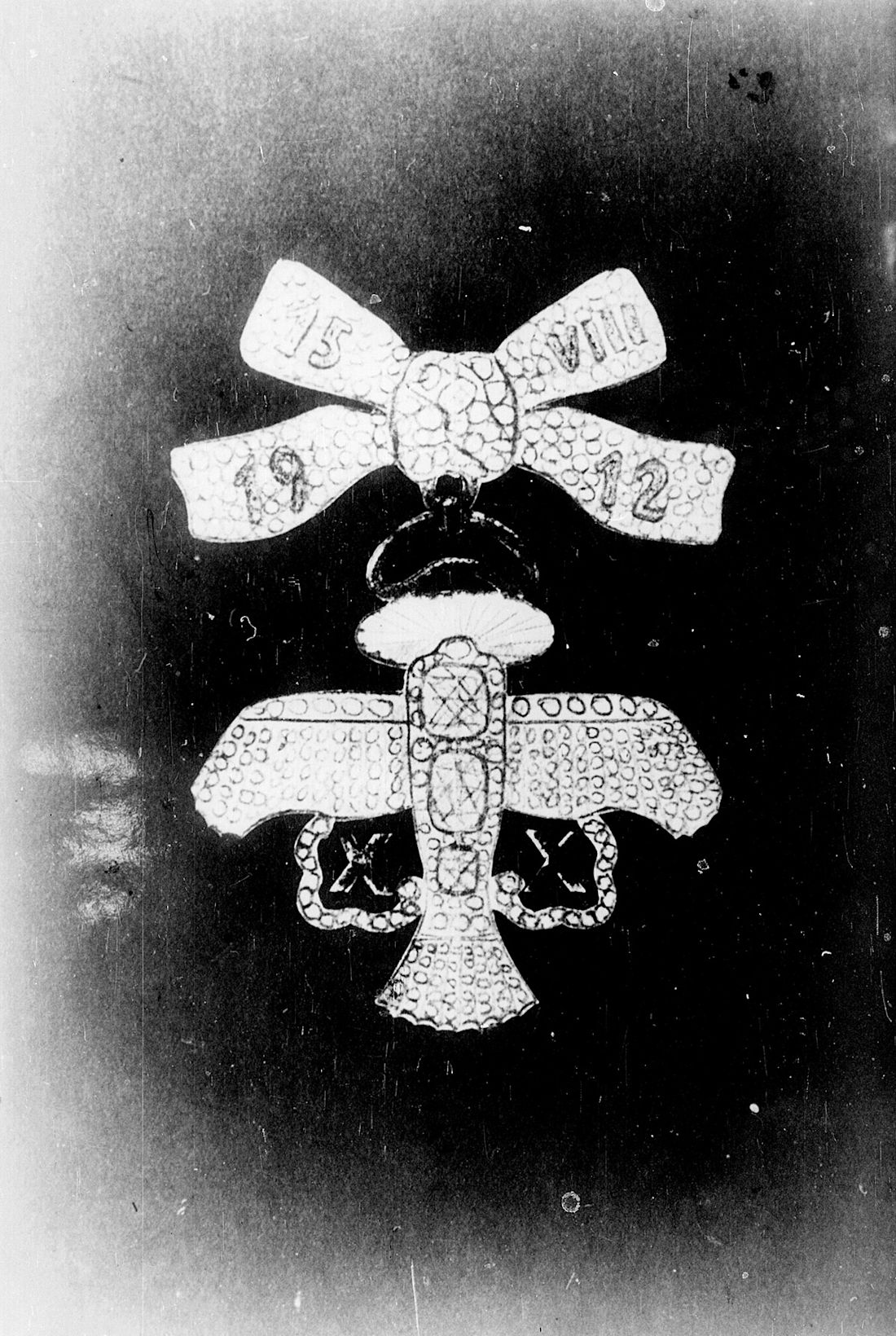
Lilly Steinschneider's aeroplane brooch dated 15 August 1912 commemorating her earning her pilot's licence

On 15 August 1912, she passed her flying test. This was commemorated by a specially commissioned brooch shaped like an aeroplane emblazoned with the date of her achievement.

Steinschneider was the first Hungarian woman and second woman from the Austro-Hungarian empire to qualify as a pilot (the first was aviator Božena Laglerová). Steinschneider received pilot's license number four in Hungary. She flew an Etrich Taube. On 6 October 1912 she took part in the air show held at Nagyvárad over the heads of a crowd of 2000 people, and was given a hero's welcome. She received huge amounts of fan mail and love letters but was also subject to criticism for breaching traditional female roles and to antisemitism from some quarters.

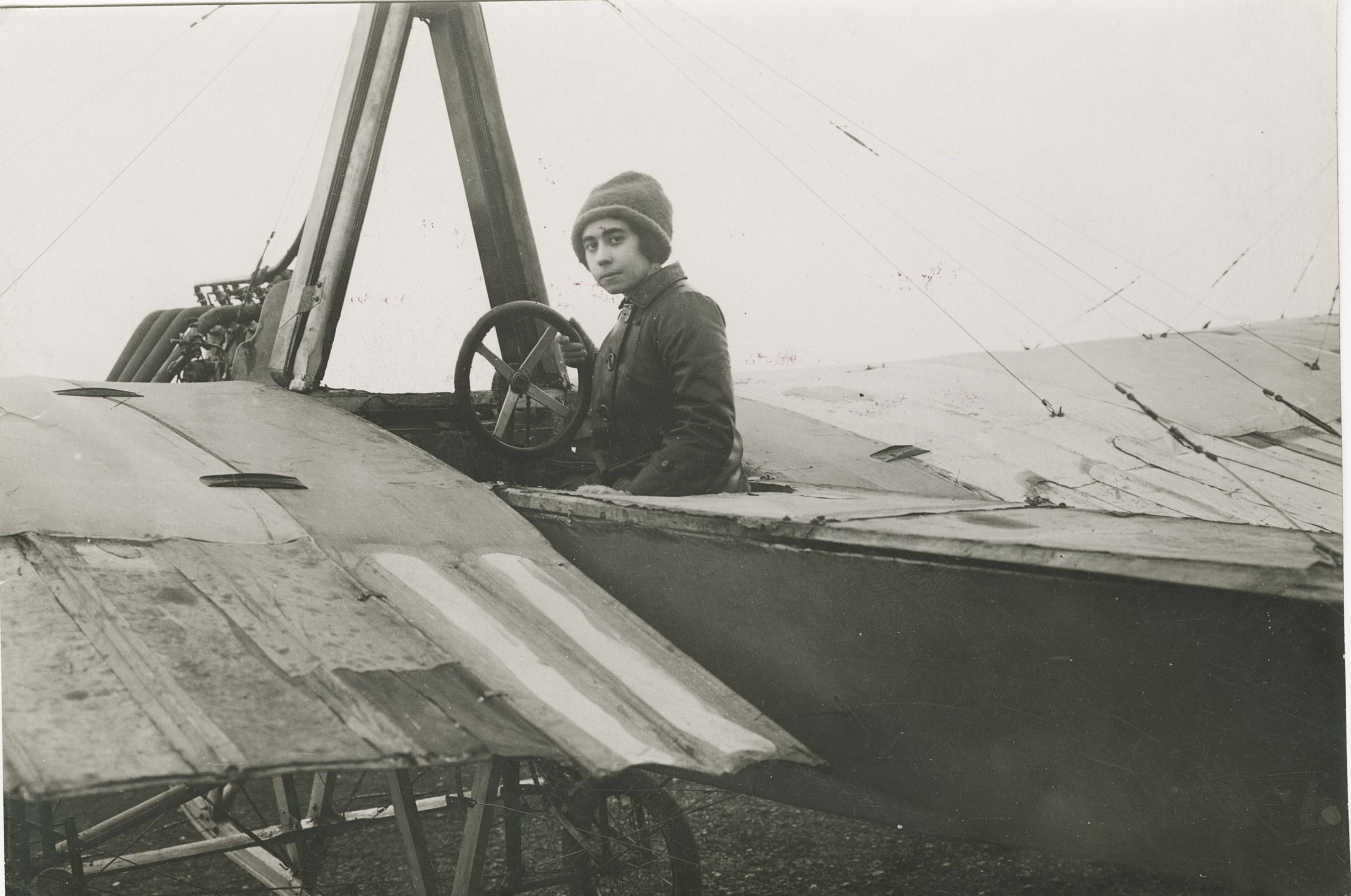
Lilly Steinschneider 1912 - Touring Club Italiano

She caused a stir as a woman at the flight meeting at Aspern airfield in 1913. Steinschneider experienced a crash landing at the event but walked away from the accident, and later went up as a passenger with Maurice Chevillard, who flew upside down at 1000 metres. The French woman pilot Jeanne Pallier also flew that day and the two women placed third and fourth in the duration contest.

On 20 August 1913, at the Aviation Day of Saint Stephen, put on by the Hungarian Aero Club, Steinschneider won the speed competition by flying a 2500-metre lap in 1 minute and 27 seconds. She came in second across the day's six competitions, beaten only by Viktor Wittmann.

== Marriage and later life ==
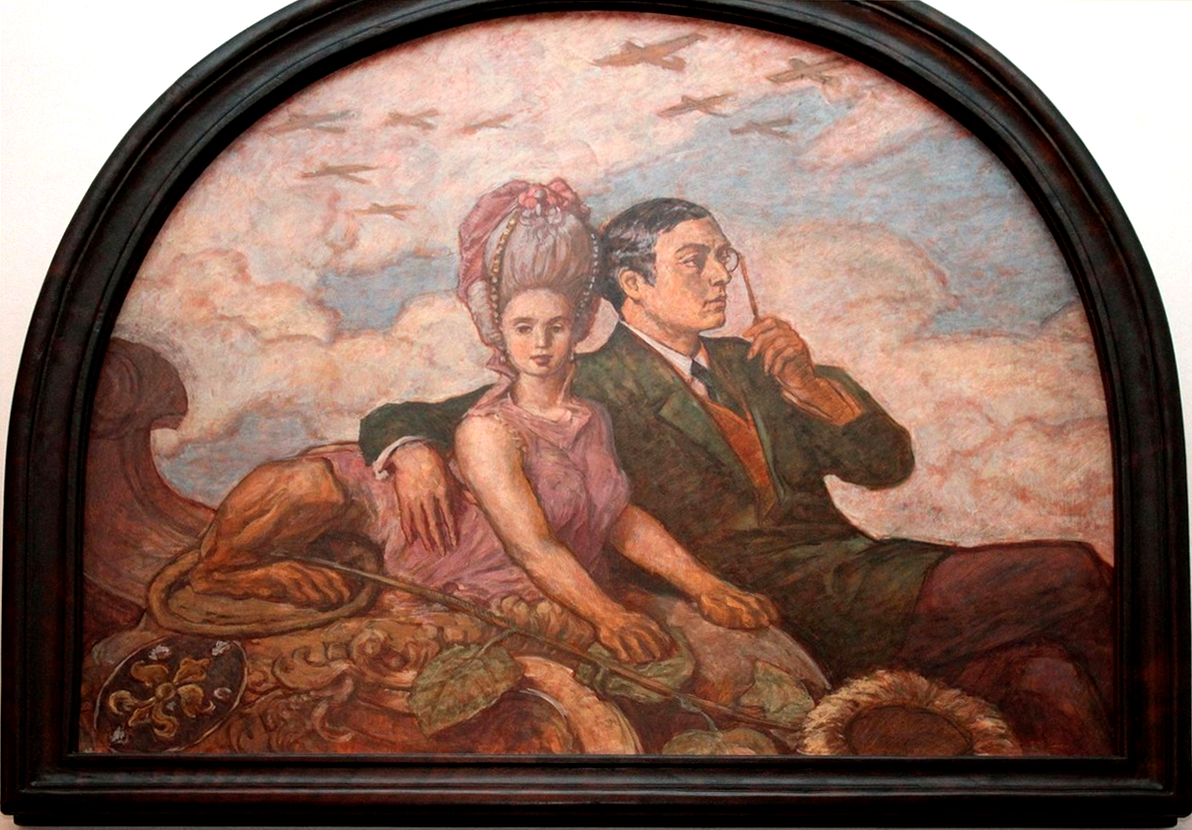
Count Hansi with his wife, the aviation pioneer Lilly Steinschneider, portrayed by the painter Alfred Offner (1879–1947), who lived for a time in Ronsperg Castle, the couple's home

In 1913, Steinschneider was baptised. In 1914, she married Johann (Hansi) Graf Coudenhove-Kalergi, of the Coudenhove-Kalergi family, son of Heinrich von Coudenhove-Kalergi and Mitsuko Aoyama, and older brother of Richard von Coudenhove-Kalergi. She was known as Lilly Coudenhove-Kalergi or Countess Coudenhove-Kalergi following her marriage.

After her marriage, she stopped flying and lived with her husband in Ronsperg Castle in Bohemia area of the Czech Republic. Civilian flight was banned during the First World War, and Steinschneider worked as a nurse on the Eastern front, caring for typhoid patients.

In 1927 she gave birth to her daughter, Maria Electa Thecla Elisabeth Christina Helena Sophia Coudenhove-Kalergi, known as Marina, who was delivered by caesarean section. In 1939 she and her daughter moved to Italy from the Czech Republic to avoid Nazi persecution for her Jewish heritage.

Despite this, she wrote a series of warm letters to her husband, which did not yet foreshadow their later divorce. Presumably, she was forced to live apart from her husband because of her Jewish origins. In any case, her husband issued a separation statement on August 18, 1943.

Very little information remains about the later life of Hungary's first female pilot. It is known that her marriage ended in divorce in 1960, as her husband remarried in Regensburg in 1963 at the age of 69 and died two years later. Pál Rév, a curator at the Transport Museum, made numerous attempts in the 1960s to obtain information about her adventurous life from the countess herself. Lilly was living in southern France at the time and received the letters written to her, as can be seen from her signature on the postage stamp, but she did not reply.

She died on 28 March 1975 in Geneva.

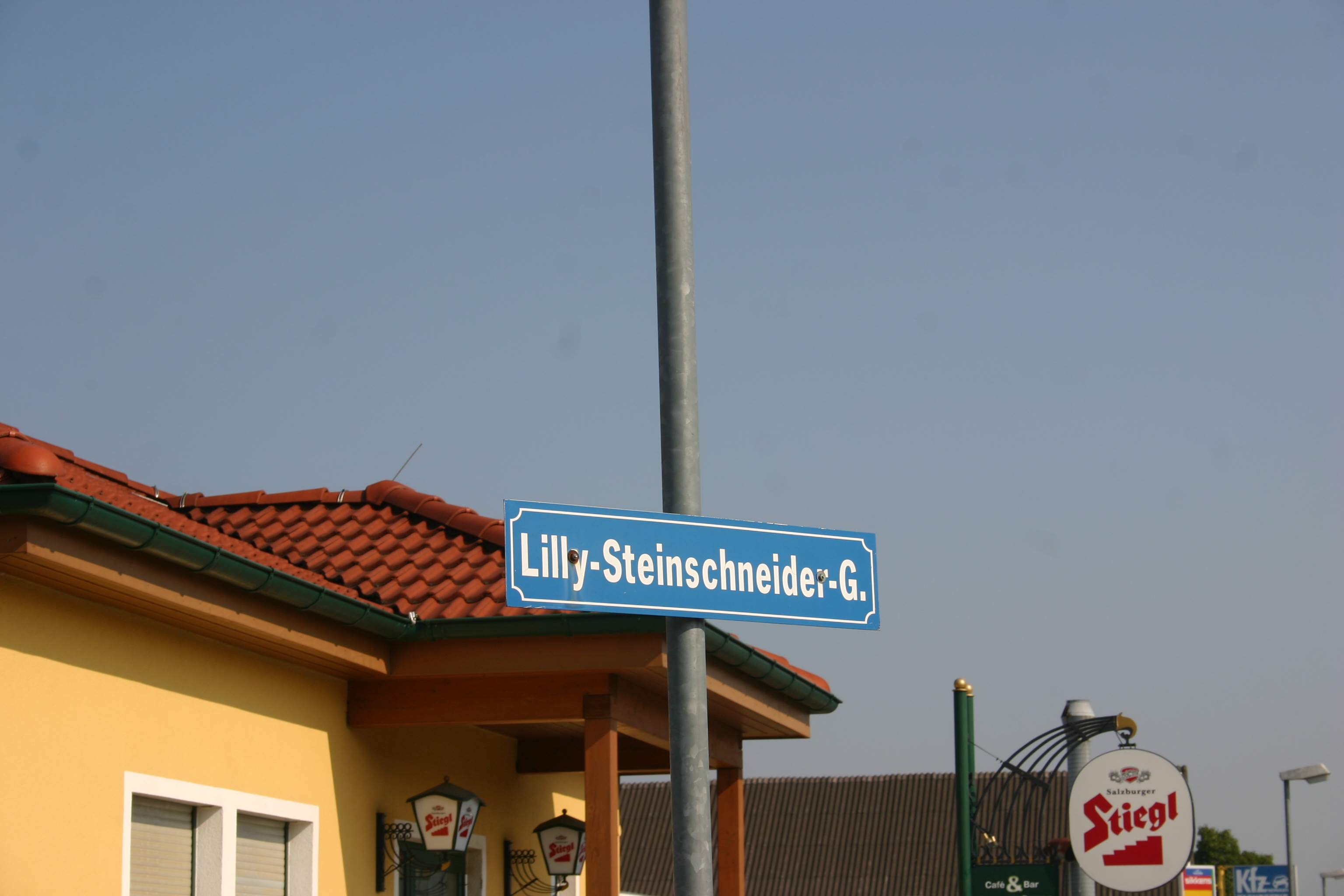
Lilly Steinschneider Gasse in Wiener Neustadt

== Commemoration ==
Lilly-Steinschneider-Gasse in Wiener Neustadt in Austria was named in her honour.

The writer Bernhard Setzwein describes her life and marriage to Johann Graf Coudenhove-Kalergi in his novel The Bohemian Samurai, published in 2017.
