= Paneuropean Union =

Oldest European unification movement

International Paneuropean Union
- The stars from the flag of Europe have been added to the Paneuropean flag in 1955.

- Original flag (1922)
- Abbreviation: PEU
- Formation: 1923
- Founder: Richard von Coudenhove-Kalergi
- Type: International non-governmental organization
- Legal status: NGO
- Purpose: European unification movement
- Headquarters: Strasbourg
- Location: France
- Region served: Europe
- President: Pavo Barišić
- Main organ: General Assembly
- Website: www.international-paneuropean-union.eu

The International Paneuropean Union, also referred to as the Pan-European Movement and the Pan-Europa Movement, is an international organisation and the oldest European unification movement. It began with the publishing of Richard von Coudenhove-Kalergi's manifesto Paneuropa (1923), which presented the idea of a unified European State. The Union's General Secretariat is located in Munich, but maintains branches across Europe.

Since February 2025, the President of the Union is Pavo Barišić, while Alain Terrenoire serves as the Honorary President. The current vice president is Walburga Habsburg Douglas, a former member of the Swedish Parliament.

== History ==
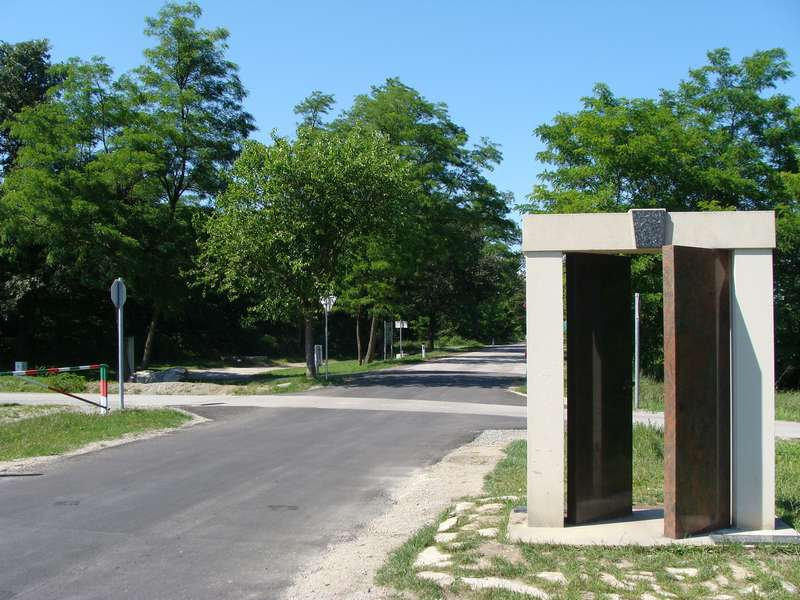
The Austrian-Hungarian border crossing where the Pan-European Picnic took place in 1989

Richard von Coudenhove-Kalergi, a member of the Bohemian Coudenhove-Kalergi family and the son of an Austro-Hungarian diplomat and a Japanese mother, was the organisation's central figure and President until his death in 1972.

As French prime minister and follower of the Paneuropean Union Aristide Briand delivered a widely recognized speech at the League of Nations in Geneva on 5 September 1929 for a federal Europe to secure Europe and settle the historic Franco-German enmity.

The organisation was prohibited by Nazi Germany in 1933, and was founded again after the Second World War. Winston Churchill lauded the movement's work for a unified Europe prior to the war in his famous Zurich speech in 1946. The French branch was founded by Georges Pompidou and Louis Terrenoire, subsequently French President and Minister for Information respectively, with the support of Charles de Gaulle. Otto von Habsburg, the head of the Habsburg dynasty and former Crown Prince of Austria-Hungary, became involved with the Paneuropean Union in the 1930s, was elected its Vice President in 1957 and became its International President in 1973, after Coudenhove's death.

The organisation was much reviled by the communist regimes of the Eastern Bloc. The organisation became renowned for its role in organising the Pan-European Picnic, an important event during the Revolutions of 1989.

As of 2023, the Paneuropean Union Parliamentary Group in the European Parliament consists of over 120 members from nearly all of the EU Member States and meets regularly during the sessions of the Parliament in Strasbourg.

== Ideology ==
The organisation believes in a strong, politically and militarily united Europe while supporting humanist and Christian values. The EPU is committed to uniting the diverse peoples of Europe, promoting peace, liberty, and rule of law, and for developing stronger democracy and human rights across Europe. The organisation supports the enlargement of the European Union and encourages all European countries to gain full EU membership. The EPU advocates the EU to become an independent, self-sufficient, and peaceful superpower. The EPU also believes in maintaining a European Common Security and Defence Policy, and establishing a European army alongside strong cooperation with NATO.

=== Kalergi Plan ===
The Kalergi Plan is a far-right, antisemitic conspiracy theory that claims that Richard von Coudenhove-Kalergi, creator of the Paneuropean Union, concocted a plot to mix and replace White Europeans with other races via immigration (mainly Arab Muslims, Black Africans and South Asians). The conspiracy theory is most often associated with European groups and parties, but it has also spread to North American politics.

== Member organisations ==
As of October 2026, the Paneuropean Union consists of member organizations in 31 countries across Europe:

- Albania
- Andorra
- Austria
- Belgium
- Bosnia and Herzegovina
- Bulgaria
- Croatia
- Czech Republic
- Estonia
- Finland
- France
- Germany
- Italy
- Kosovo
- Latvia
- Luxembourg
- Montenegro
- North Macedonia
- Poland
- Portugal
- Romania
- San Marino
- Serbia
- Slovakia
- Slovenia
- Spain
- Sweden
- Switzerland
- Ukraine

== Presidents ==
No.	Image	Name	Term	Notes
1		Richard von Coudenhove-Kalergi; Count of Coudenhove-Kalergi (1894–1972)	1923–1972	Elected the first international president in 1926
2		Otto von Habsburg; MEP for Germany (1912–2011)	1973–2004	Former Crown Prince Otto of Austria-Hungary
3		Alain Terrenoire; MEP for France (born 1941)	2004–2025	Former Member of Parliament and MEP, France
4		Pavo Barišić (born 1959)	2025–present	Former Minister of Science and Education, Croatia

== Individual members ==
The Paneuropean Union lists the following as historical members:

- Konrad Adenauer
- Raymond Barre
- Léon Blum
- Aristide Briand
- Paul Claudel
- Benedetto Croce
- Albert Einstein
- Sigmund Freud
- Charles de Gaulle
- Alfons Goppel
- Otto von Habsburg
- Gerhart Hauptmann
- Bronisław Huberman
- Bruno Kreisky
- Paul Löbe
- Salvador de Madariaga
- Heinrich Mann
- Thomas Mann
- Johan Ludwig Mowinckel
- Fridtjof Nansen
- José Ortega y Gasset
- Georges Pompidou
- Rainer Maria Rilke
- Arthur Schnitzler
- Kurt Schuschnigg
- Franz Josef Strauß
- Richard Strauss
- Gustav Stresemann
- Paul Valéry
- Franz Werfel
- Stefan Zweig
- Mats Eliasson

== See also ==
- European integration – mainly through the European Union and the Council of Europe
- Euroscepticism – opposition to the process of political European integration
- PanEuropa España – the Spanish branch of Paneuropean Union
- PanEuropa Armenia – the Armenian branch of Paneuropean Union
- Pan-European identity
- Politics of Europe
- Pro-Europeanism
- United States of Europe
