= Siergiej Muchanow =

Sergei Sergeevich Mukhanov (Russian: Сергей Сергеевич Муха́нов; Polish: Siergiej Siergiejewicz Muchanow; 1833, Vologda, Russian Empire – May 29, 1897, Przemęczany, Vistula Land, Russian Empire; now Poland) was a Russian official, an officer in the Special Corps of Gendarmes, later also director of the Warsaw Theatre Directorate and second husband of the Polish pianist Maria Kalergis.

== Life ==
=== Youth and military career ===
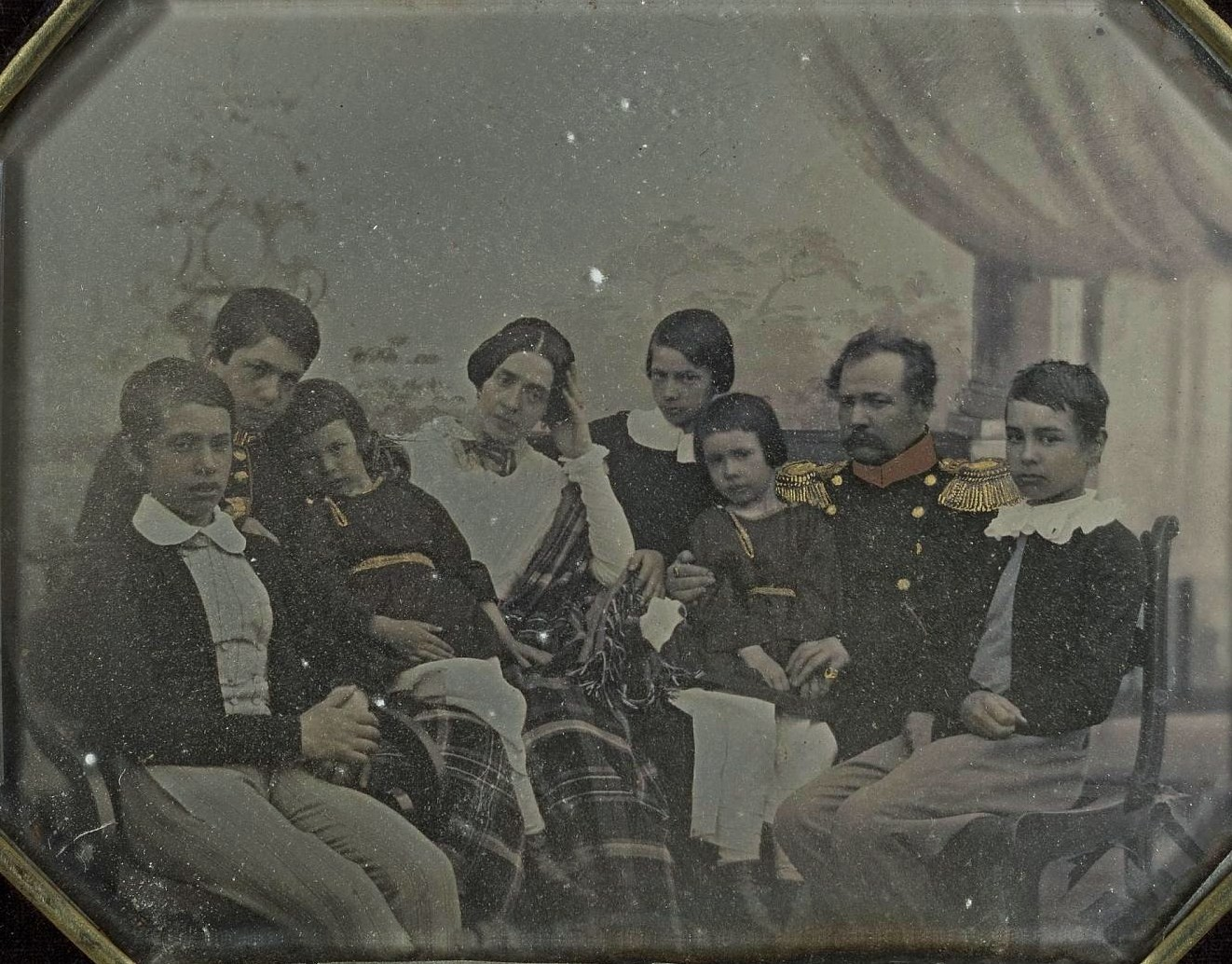
Mukhanov family in 1847

Sergei S. Mukhanov (or Muchanow by Polish orthography) was born in northern Russian town Vologda, as a third child to the family of major general Sergei Nikolaievich Mukhanov, governor of Kharkov Governorate (now Ukraine), and Minadora, Countess von Sievers.

Serving in the military from his youth, he found himself in Warsaw in 1861, being appointed adjutant general to Alexander von Lüders and becoming a gendarme lieutenant in July 1862 – in the latter of which roles he served as chief of police in Warsaw and, among other things, was responsible for compiling the nominal lists according to them enforced conscription of 12,000 Polish men to the Russian Imperial Army were carried out. (This measure was intended to prevent the explosion of the rebellion, but it proved unsuccessful and, on the contrary, hastened it.) When the January Uprising began he fought as adjutant alongside the next governor, Grand Duke Constantine Nikolaevich of Russia. Yet, two months later (March 1863), while the Uprising gradually gained its momentum, he resigned as police chief.

=== Organizer of Polish cultural life ===
Almost from the very beginning of his stay in Warsaw Muchanow had belonged to the aristocratic artistic salons, particularly that of the pianist Maria Kalergis (née Nesselrode). Maria's estranged first husband died in 1863–10 years younger than her, and hoping to raise his social position by marrying her, Muchanow proposed and was accepted. The wedding took place in Baden-Baden on 30 September 1863. Muchanow's resignation of his career to marry her and the resulting financial strains, however, caused Maria to have a nervous breakdown and it was only some time later that she was able to go to Saint Petersburg to obtain his appointment as administrator of imperial palaces in the Kingdom of Poland and President of the Warsaw Theatre Directorate. Also supported by governor Fiodor Berg in this request, Muchanow received these posts on 27 April 1868. He and his wife then brought about a rise in theatrical life in Warsaw – with the aid of the Directorate's administrative directors Mikołaj Bojanowski and Bogumił Foland, Muchanow was able to give the city's theatres settled financing systems and find an additional income source in the form of tax concessions in the gardens around the theatres. He also managed to overhaul the city's theatre buildings and oversee the opening of the Summer Theatre (Teatr Letni).

In these efforts, Muchanow was able to count on the support of governor Berg (convinced to support the theatres by Maria) as well as major Polish cultural figures such as Stanisław Moniuszko, Jan Chęciński, Aleksander Narcyz Przezdziecki, Józef Kenig and Władysław Bogusławski. He invited Helena Modrzejewska to Warsaw, granting her various privileges, such as selection of the repertoire – and she appeared onstage there in plays of Shakespeare, Słowacki, Schiller and Fredro. The operatic repertoire, swelled by songs by Moniuszko, also prospered. Muchanow ensured the creation of a team of actors and Modrzejewska and actors already well known to Warsaw audiences such as Alojzy Żółkowski, Jan Królikowski, Wiktoryna Bakałowiczowa, Salomea Palińska and Aleksandra Rakiewiczowa were joined by newcomers such as Romana Popiel, Wincenty Rapacki, Bolesław Leszczyński, Marian Prażmowski and Edward Wolski. This period became known as "the age of stars" (epoka gwiazd).

Muchanow's success declined from 1874 with the death of Maria on 22 June and of Jan Chęciński on 30 December. Modrzejewska thus lost her protectress and, getting entangled in problems with the censors and other company members, she soon left for the United States. Rapacki, Bogusławski and Emil Deryng could not fill Modrzejewska's role as head of the company, nor could Deryng's daughter Maria. Muchanow made a last attempt at glory by making Jan Tatarkiewicz director in 1878 and taking on actors such as Jadwiga Czaki, Adolfina Zimajer, Józef Kotarbiński and Honorata Leszczyńska (daughter of Wincenty Rapacki), but neither measure had success and Muchanow began putting on little theater and opera, focusing instead on the ballet company.

=== Retirement and death ===
He retired from his post as head of the directorate on 12 June 1880 and soon moved to countryside; in 1882 marrying Waleria Pignan. (Pignan had made her debut in September 1869 as a student of the Warsaw ballet school, had performed in several well-known productions of the 1870s, and had become known as one of the Directorate's most talented dancers before leaving the stage to marry Muchanow.)

Died on May 29, 1897, in Przemęczany village near town Miechów.
