= Emil Starkenstein =

Czech-Jewish pharmacologist

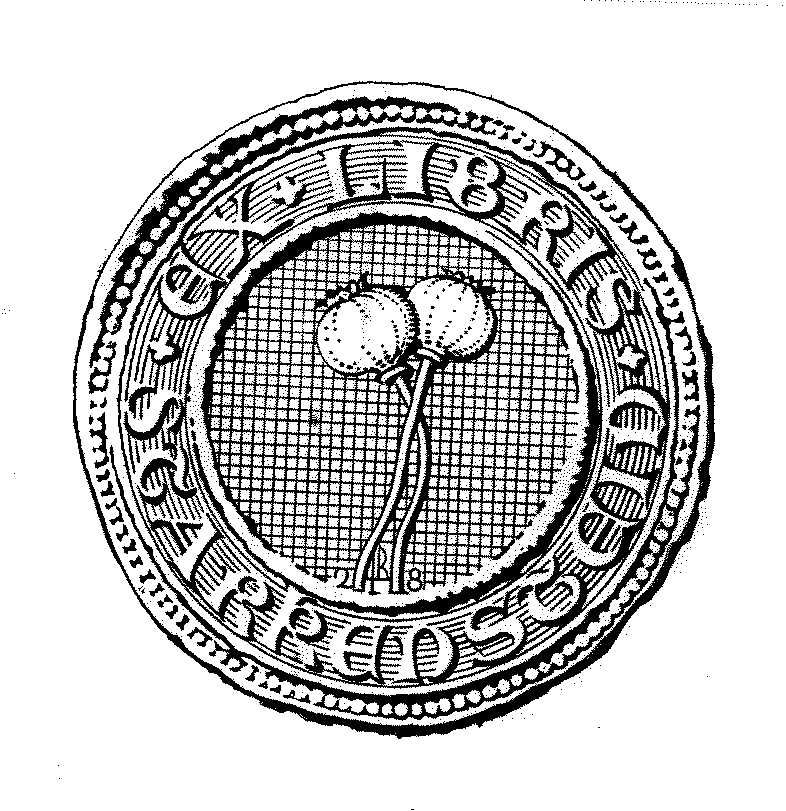
This bookplate appears in books that were part of the collection of Emil Starkenstein.

Emil Starkenstein (December 18, 1884 – November 6, 1942) was a Czech-Jewish pharmacologist and one of the founders of clinical pharmacology. He was killed in the Mauthausen-Gusen concentration camp along with a few hundred refugees from Amsterdam after an incident in which a Dutch Jew resisted a Nazi patrol.

Emil Starkenstein was born in the Bohemian (now Czech) town of Poběžovice (Ronsperg) to Jewish German parents. The family had many members who became local physicians. Prof. Starkenstein researched and published a family tree in 1927 which traced his family roots as far back as 1350 and included such figures as R. Benjamin Wolf (1777-1851), R.Eleasar Löw, R. Moses Isserles (1520–72), and several in the Katzenelbogen line, including R.Saul Wahl Katzenelbogen who, according to the glossary of the family tree, 'became king of Poland for one night after the death of Stephen Bathory.

He was a professor at the German University in Prague (formerly German Charles Ferdinand University – see Charles University in Prague) until the 1938 German occupation of Czechoslovakia. He continued his work as a refugee in the Netherlands. After the German invasion of the Netherlands in 1939, Starkenstein was confined to an area in Amsterdam with other Jews, where they were forced to wear yellow badges and banned from civil service employment. He was arrested and deported in 1941, via Prague and Terezin, to the Mauthausen concentration camp. His wife and daughter survived in hiding in the Netherlands, and after the war, his wife Marie (née Weil) donated his extensive collection of papers (more than 20,000 items) to the Czechoslovak state. In 2002, these papers were finally deposited in the archives of Charles University in Prague. In addition to the scientific papers, Starkenstein had one of the most impressive pharmacological libraries ever assembled. Before he was killed in the Nazi concentration camps, his family agreed to sell the collection to rare book dealer Ludwig Gottschalk, but when Gottschalk faced deportation to the camps himself, he secreted the library in several locations in the Black Forest and went into hiding. After the war, he reassembled the Starkenstein books and for nearly half a century sold items from the collection under the name Biblion, Inc., in Forest Hills, New York. A portion of the library was purchased by the LuEsther T. Mertz Library of the New York Botanical Garden. These 147 volumes, primarily focused on the medicinal uses of plants, are distinguished by Starkenstein's bookplate.

== Works ==
- Die neueren Arzneimittel und die pharmakologischen Grundlagen ihrer Anwendung in der ärztlichen Praxis . Springer, Berlin 2nd edition 1914 Digital edition by the University and State Library Düsseldorf
