= Ceaucé =

- Commune
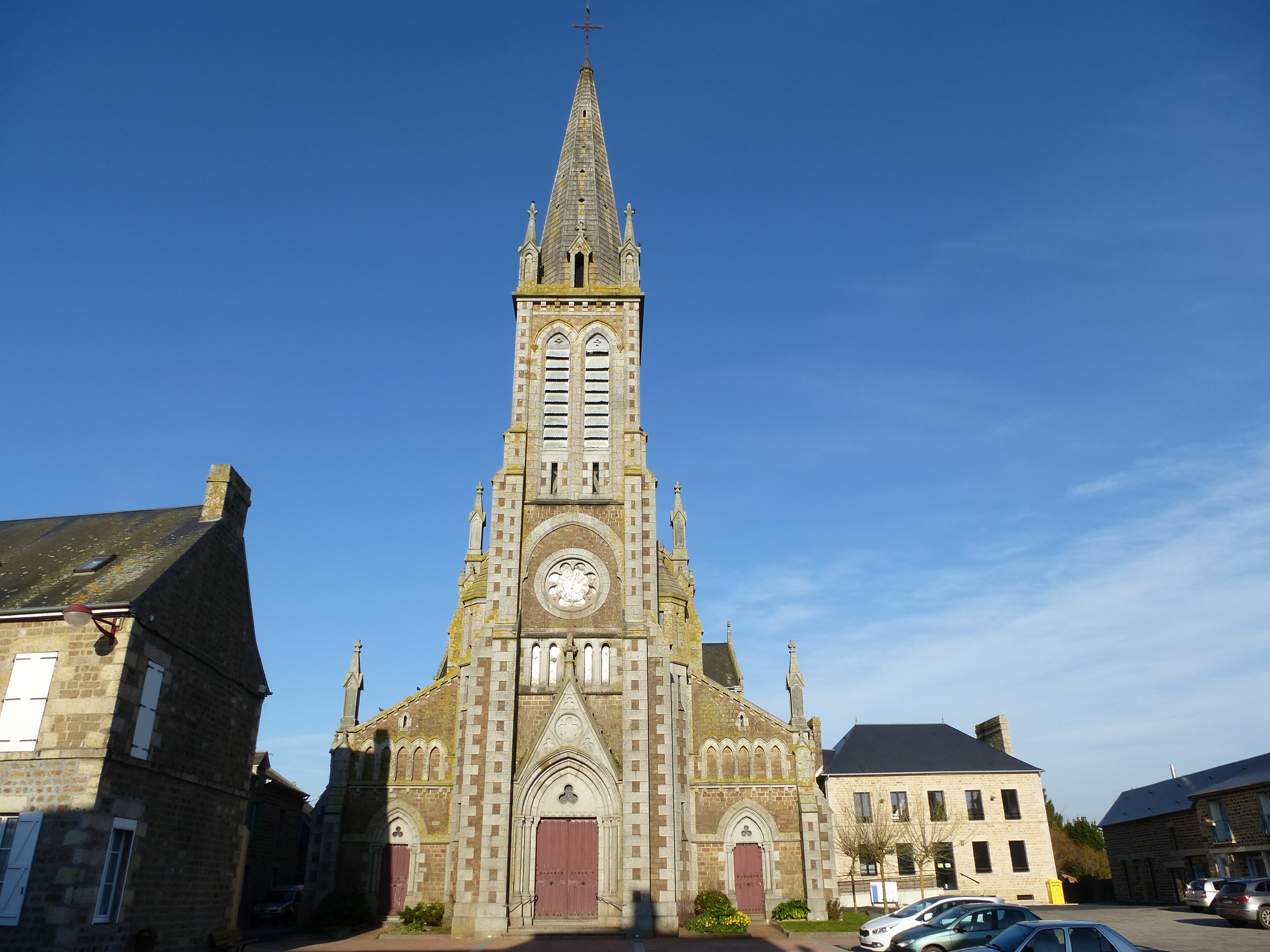
- The church in Ceaucé
- Location of Ceaucé
- Location within France Location within Normandy
- Coordinates: 48°29′41″N 0°37′24″W
- Country: France
- Region: Normandy
- Department: Orne
- Arrondissement: Alençon
- Canton: Bagnoles de l'Orne Normandie
- Intercommunality: Andaine-Passais

Government
  - Mayor (2020–2026): Michel Dargent
- Area^{1}: 41.52 km^{2} (16.03 sq mi)
- Elevation: 147 m (482 ft)
- Highest elevation: 262 m (860 ft)
- Lowest elevation: 100 m (330 ft)
- Population (2023): 1,165
  - Density: 28.06/km^{2} (72.67/sq mi)
- Time zone: UTC+01:00 (CET)
  - Summer (DST): UTC+02:00 (CEST)
- INSEE/Postal code: 61075 /61330
- Website: www.mairie-ceauce.fr
- ^{1} French Land Register data, which excludes lakes, ponds, glaciers > 1 km^{2} (0.386 sq mi or 247 acres) and river estuaries.

Ceaucé (French pronunciation: [sose]) is a commune in the Orne department in north-western France.

== Geography ==
The commune is made up of the following collection of villages and hamlets, Le Mont Chauveau, La Largerie, Les Échalliers, Laubrière, Ceaucé, Le Haut Fresnay, La Vérie, La Petite Métairie and Chaumont.

The river Varenne flows through the commune.

The commune is in the Normandie-Maine Regional Natural Park.

== Points of Interest ==
=== National heritage sites ===
The commune has three buildings/areas listed as a Monument historique.

- Grande-Pierre Manor is a 16th-century Manor House, declared as a Monument historique in 1974.
- Manoir de la Servière is a 14th-century Manor House, declared as a Monument historique in 1975.
- Menhir de la Pierre is a Neolithic megalith with four almost regular faces that was discovered in 1936 and listed as a Monument in 1976.

== Notable people ==
- Louis Terrenoire (1908 – 1992) was a French politician who is buried here.

== Twin towns ==
Saint-Fraimbault is twinned with:

- North Petherton, England, since 1993

== See also ==
- Communes of the Orne department
- Parc naturel régional Normandie-Maine
