= Warsaw Theatre Directorate =

The Warsaw Theatre Directorate (Warszawskie Teatry Rządowe) was the chief authority for theatres in the Duchy of Warsaw in Warsaw during the 19th and early 20th centuries. It was set up by decree of Frederick Augustus I of Saxony on 14 April 1810 as the Rządowa Dyrekcja Teatru (Government Directorate for Theatre), its draft statute having been developed by Wojciecha Bogusławskiego. In 1822 it changed its name to Dyrekcja Teatrów i Wszelkich Widowisk Dramatycznych i Muzycznych w Królestwie (Directorate of all theatres and dramatic and musical performance in the Kingdom), then in 1833 to the Warsaw Theatre Directorate. It ceased to exist in July 1915.

It guided theatrical output and provided theatres with financial stability, enabling shows in Polish to be put on and new theatre buildings to be constructed. Its companies included ones for operettas, ballets, dramas, comedies, the National Theatre and later opera and farce. It had 5 buildings:

- from 1833 - Teatr Wielki and the Teatr Rozmaitości
- from 1870 - Teatr Letni
- from 1880 - Teatr Mały
- from 1881 - Teatr Nowy
- from 1901 - Teatr Nowości

== Presidents ==
The body's president was supported by a board of governors and by directors, and from 1907 by literary managers.

| From | To | President |
|---|---|---|
| 1810 | 1813 | Julian Ursyn Niemcewicz |
| 1814 | 1820 | Józef Lipiński |
| 1821 | 1830 | Aleksander Rożniecki |
| 1832 | 1842 | Józef Rautenstrauch |
| 1842 | 1862 | Ignacy Abramowicz |
| 1862 | 1868 | A. Hauke |
| 1868 | 1880 | Siergiej Muchanow |
| 1880 | 1882 | Wsiewołod Wsiewołożski |
| 1882 | 1889 | Longin Gudowski |
| 1889 | 1892 | Dymitr Palicyn |
| 1892 | 1895 | Aleksander Karandiejew |
| 1895 | 1897 | Piotr Andriejew |
| 1898 | 1901 | Paweł Iwanow |
| 1901 | 1908 | Konstantin Herschelman |
| 1908 | 1914 | Jurij Małyszew |
| 1914 | 1915 | Jurij Burman |

== Sources ==
- Bartłomiej tytuł= Encyklopedia Warszawy Kaczorowski: Warszawa: Wydaw. Naukowe PWN, 1994, s. 933, 934. ISBN 83-01-08836-2.
- Maria Olga Bieńka: Warszawskie teatry rządowe : dramat i komedia : 1890–1915. Warszawa: Instytut Sztuki Polskiej Akademii Nauk, 2003. ISBN 83-89101-12-2.
- Teatr polski w latach 1890-1918. Warszawa: PWN, 1988, s. 272. ISBN 978-83-01-06777-9.
