= Heinrich von Coudenhove-Kalergi =

Austrian diplomat and writer (1859–1906)

- Count of Coudenhove-Kalergi
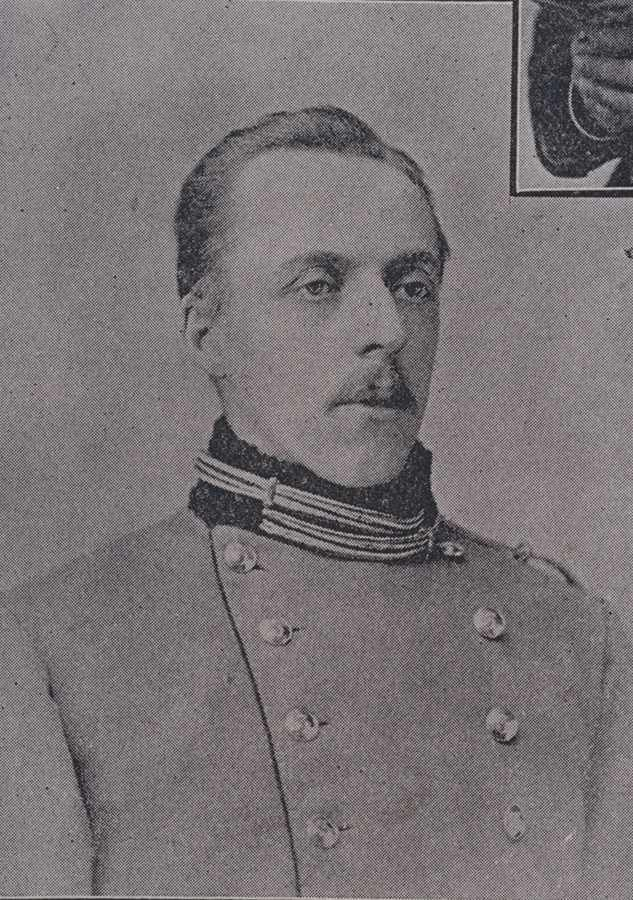
- Heinrich in 1895
- Born: 12 October 1859; Vienna, Austrian Empire
- Died: 4 May 1906 (aged 46); Poběžovice, Bohemia, Austria-Hungary
- Noble family: Coudenhove-Kalergi
- Spouse: Mitsuko Aoyama
- Issue: Richard von Coudenhove-Kalergi
- Father: Franz Karl Graf von Coudenhove
- Mother: Marie von Kalergi

Heinrich Johann Maria von Coudenhove-Kalergi (12 October 1859 – 14 May 1906), also known as Heinrich Coudenhove-Kalergi (styled as Count of Coudenhove until 1903 and Count of Coudenhove-Kalergi thereafter), was an Austrian diplomat and writer who was a member of the Coudenhove-Kalergi family. He was born in Vienna and died in Ronsberg, Western Bohemia (today Poběžovice in the Czech Republic). He spoke 18 languages (including Turkish, Arabic, Hebrew and Japanese), and his diplomatic postings included Athens, Rio de Janeiro, Constantinople and Buenos Aires.

He was made Deputy Minister of Austria-Hungary to Japan, where he remained for 4 years, studying Buddhism and marrying a young Japanese woman from a samurai family, Mitsuko Aoyama. They had seven children, including Richard von Coudenhove-Kalergi, best known for his role in establishing the Pan-European Movement, and Ida Friederike Görres, a well-known Catholic author.

== Views on race and religion ==
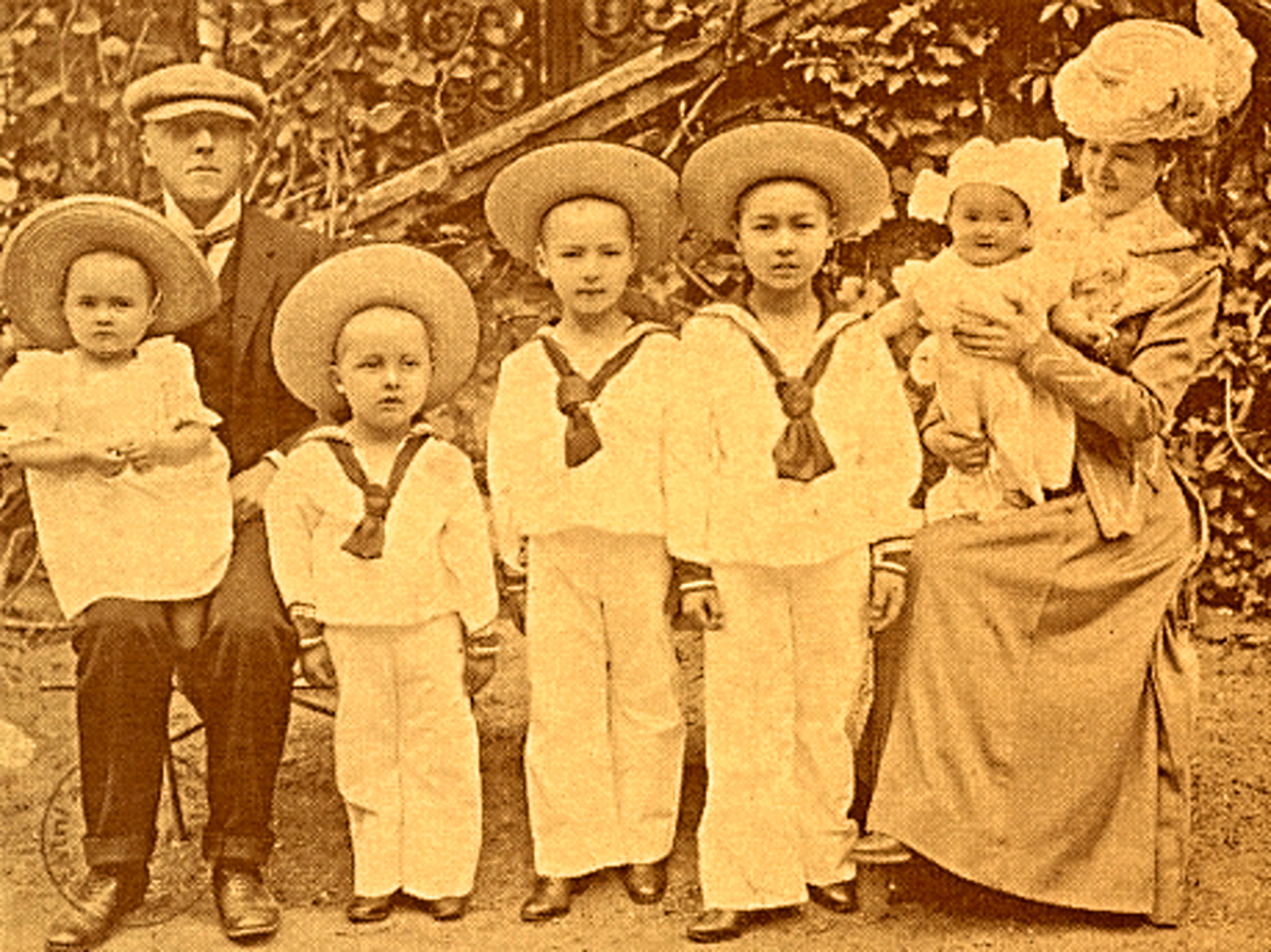
Count Heinrich Coudenhove-Kalergi and his wife Mitsuko with children in Poběžovice (Ronsperg) (1900)

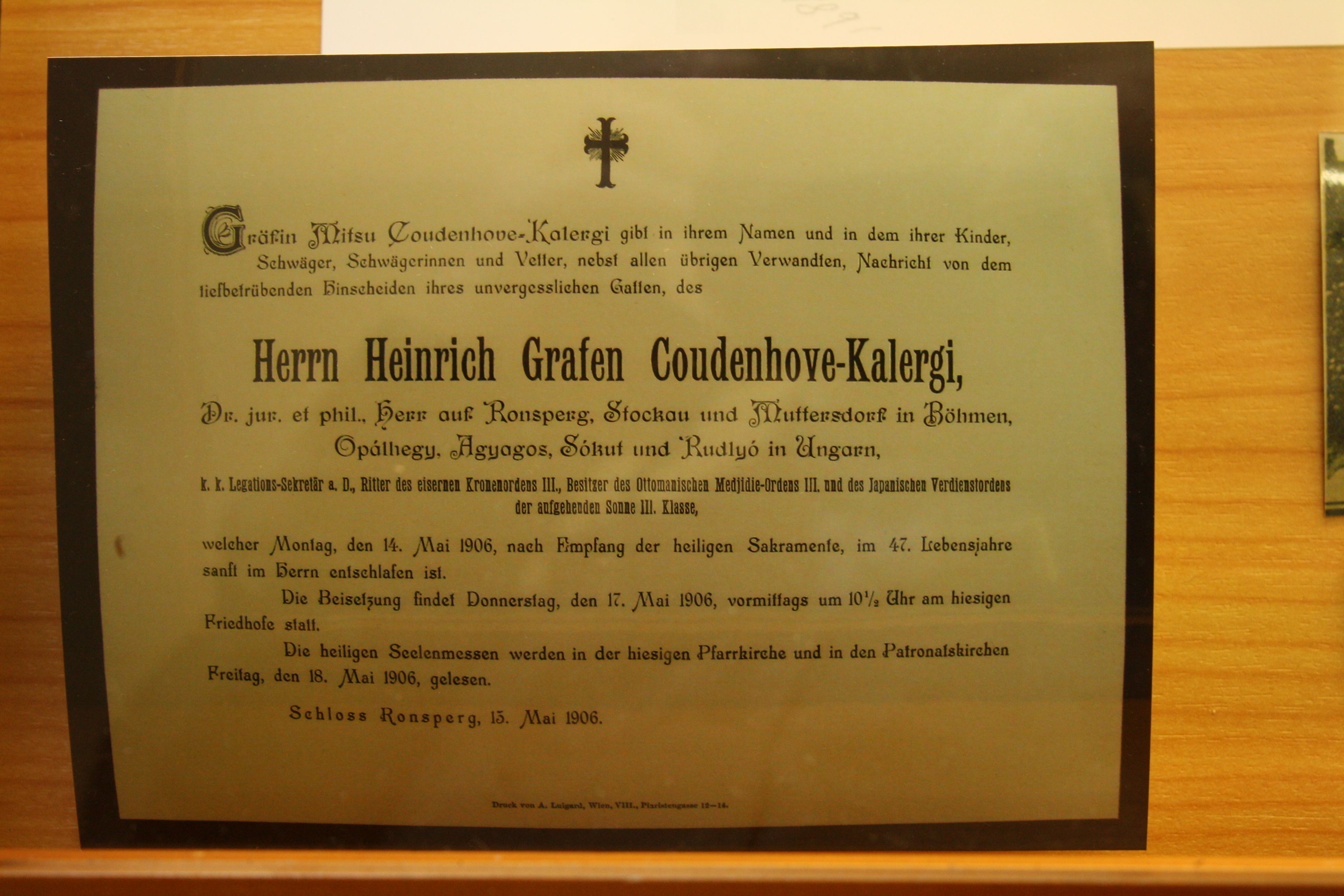
A copy of his death notice

In his youth, Heinrich Coudenhove-Kalergi had been an antisemite. He had expected to confirm his antipathy towards the Jews when he started work on his treatise, Das Wesen des Antisemitismus (The Essence of Antisemitism). But he came to a different conclusion by the time he published his book in 1901. Following an ironic critique of the new racial theories, he declared that the essence of antisemitism amounted to nothing more credible than fanatical religious hatred. He traced that fanaticism to religious bigotry that originated in the promulgation of Torah under Ezra. According to Coudenhove-Kalergi, Jewish religious bigotry provoked opposition from the relatively tolerant Greco-Roman polytheists, eliciting their anti-Judaic reaction. Antisemitism came into existence when Christianity and Islam took over the intolerant fanaticism of Judaism, and turned it against the Jews. Thus, Heinrich Coudenhove-Kalergi credited the Jews with originating religious intolerance, and condemned it as a violation of genuine religious principles. He branded every sort of anti-Judaism unchristian. He further urged liberal Christians and Jews to ally in protecting both of their religions, and religion as such, against the emerging menace of secularism.

In spite of his opposition to simplistic racial theory, Coudenhove-Kalergi agreed that Jews are racially distinct. Although he pointed out that there is no Semitic race, because Semitic is a language family; he equivocated by also remarking that the charges that Semites were uncreative were belied by civilizations formed by the Assyrians and Babylonians, who spoke Semitic languages. He further sought to defend the Jews against bigoted charges of parasitic greed and cowardice with anecdotal counterexamples of Jewish industriousness and martial courage.

== Publications ==
An English translation of his book Das Wesen des Antisemitismus (1901) was published in 1935 as Anti-Semitism Throughout the Ages, with an additional chapter on "Jew-Hatred To-Day" added by his son Richard.
