= Alain Terrenoire =

French lawyer and politician

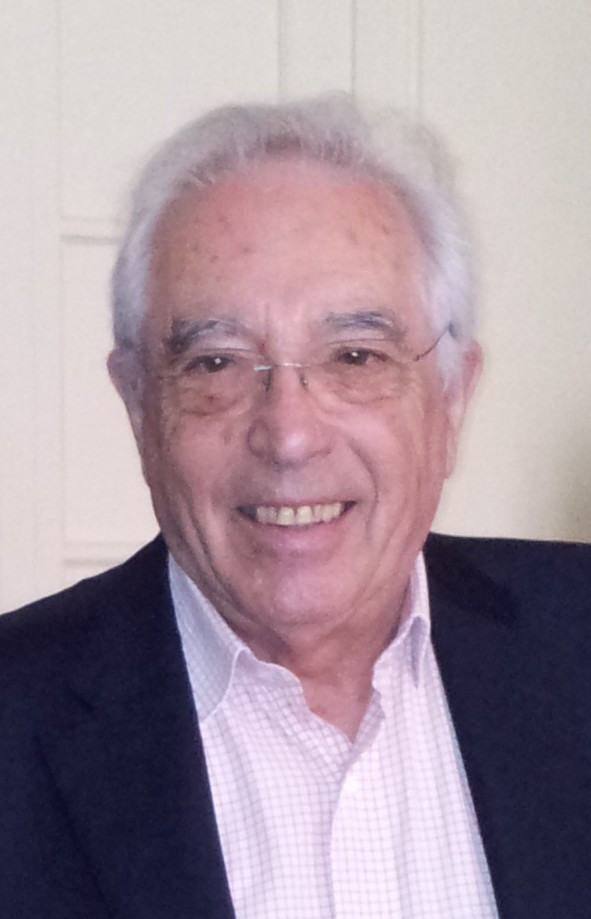
Alain Terrenoire

Alain Terrenoire (born 14 June 1941 in Lyon) is a French lawyer and politician (UNR party), a former Member of the National Assembly of France, a former Member of the European Parliament, from 2004 to 2025 the President of the Paneuropean Union when Pavo Barišić succeeded him. He is a former French delegate to the United Nations General Assembly.

He is the son of Louis Terrenoire, a former cabinet minister in the government of Charles de Gaulle.

== Recognitions ==
- Chevalier de la Légion d'honneur
- Officier de l'Ordre national du Mérite

== Publications ==
- L'Europe et Maastricht, le pour et le contre
- Le Parlement européen cet inconnu
