= Bezalel Ronsburg =

German rabbi

Personal life
- Born: 1760 Ronsperg, Bohemia
- Died: 25 September 1820 (aged 59–60) Prague, Bohemia

Religious life
- Religion: Judaism

Bezalel ben Joel Ronsburg (Hebrew: בצלאל רנשבורג; 1760 – 25 September 1820) was a Talmudist and rabbi, dayan and head of the yeshiva in Prague. Zecharias Frankel was one of his pupils.

== Biography ==
He was born in the city of Ronsperg, in modern Czechia. He went studied Torah at Schwabach, Fuerth, and Prague, where Leib Fischels and Ezekiel Landau taught him. He opposed the Reform movement.

Ronsburg was the author of Horah Gaver (Prague, 1802), commentary on the tractate Horayot, and Ma'aseh Rav (ib. 1823), marginal notes on the Talmud, reprinted in the Prague (1830–32) edition of the Talmud and in several later ones. Ronsburg's notes to the Halakot of Asher ben Jehiel were printed in the Prague (1839–46) edition of the Talmud under the title Sedeh Tzofim. They are also reprinted in Romm's Wilna edition. The following works by Ronsburg remain in manuscript (as of 1906): Pitche Niddah, (later printed by Mossad HaRav Kook) novellæ, and Sichat Chullin.

After an Hapsburg Imperial Decree in 1787, Ronsburg took the name Daniel Bezaleel Rosenbaum, the initials standing for both surnames; he continued to be known, however, as Ronsburg.
