= Michael Bacharach =

Michael Bacharach was a Dayan (Rabbinic Judge) in Prague in the second half of the 18th century.

== Jewish Encyclopedia bibliography ==
- Eisenstadt, Da'at Ḳedoshim, p. 224
- Walden, Shem ha-Gedolim he-Ḥadash, i. 90
- Löw, Gesammelte Schriften, ii. 263.L. G. I. Be
