= Górski families =

Families of Polish nobility

Nałęcz coat of arms, used by one line of the Górski family

The Górski family (Polish: Górscy, ród Górskich) is the name of several families of Polish nobility.

== See also ==
- Górski, for a list of notable people with this surname.
