= Rašovice (Kutná Hora District) =

- Municipality
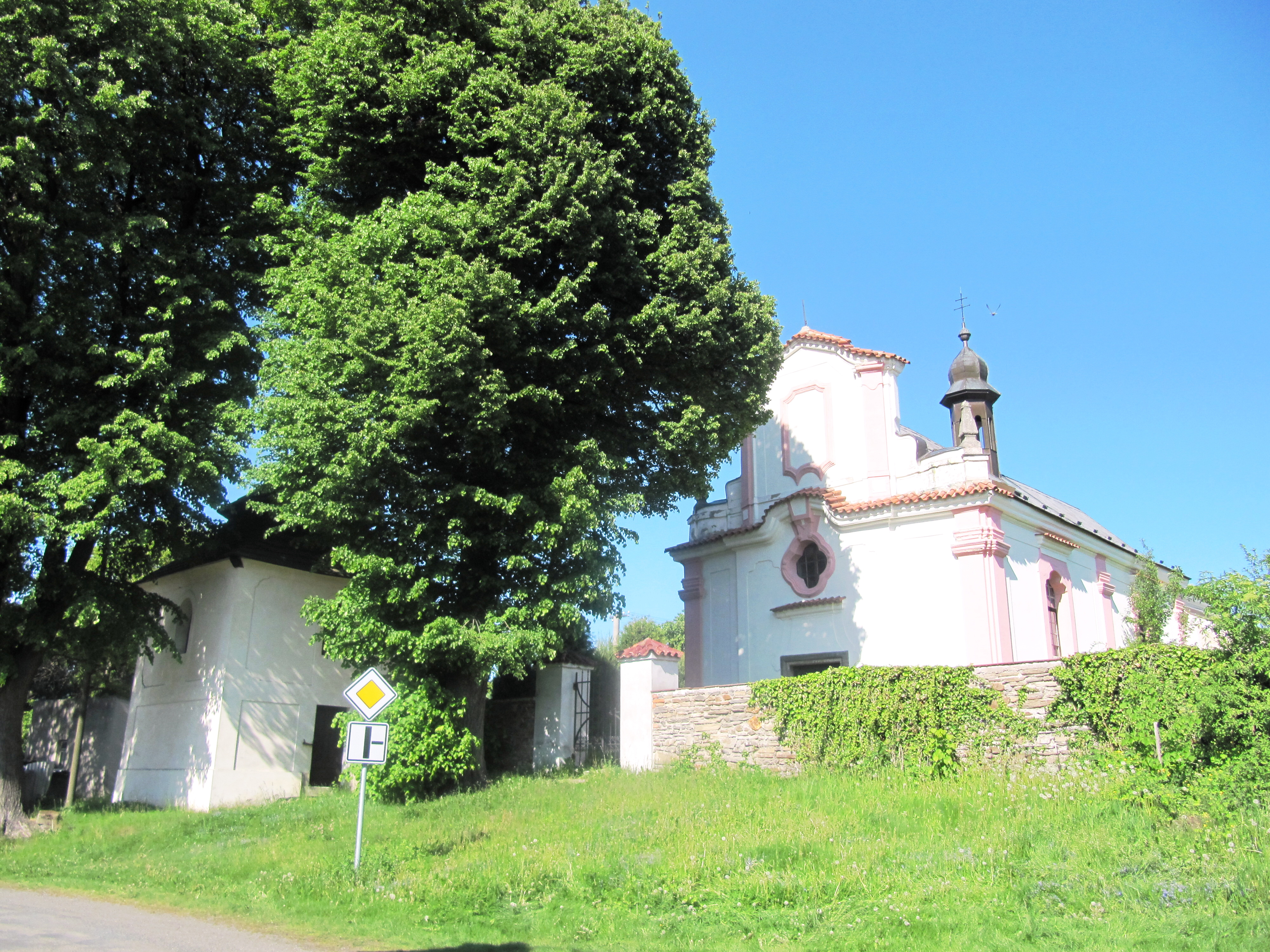
- Church of the Assumption of the Virgin Mary

- Location in the Czech Republic
- Coordinates: 49°52′57″N 15°6′9″E
- Country: Czech Republic
- Region: Central Bohemian
- District: Kutná Hora
- First mentioned: 1316

Area
  - Total: 12.33 km^{2} (4.76 sq mi)
- Elevation: 446 m (1,463 ft)

Population (2026-01-01)
  - Total: 442
  - Density: 35.8/km^{2} (92.8/sq mi)
- Time zone: UTC+1 (CET)
  - Summer (DST): UTC+2 (CEST)
- Postal code: 285 04
- Website: www.rasovice.cz

Rašovice is a municipality and village in Kutná Hora District in the Central Bohemian Region of the Czech Republic. It has about 400 inhabitants.

== Administrative division ==
Rašovice consists of four municipal parts (in brackets population according to the 2021 census):

- Rašovice (90)
- Jindice (191)
- Mančice (39)
- Netušil (80)

== Demographics ==
Historical population
Year	Pop.	±%
1869	1,332	—
1880	1,370	+2.9%
1890	1,341	−2.1%
1900	1,285	−4.2%
1910	1,190	−7.4%
1921	1,182	−0.7%
1930	1,017	−14.0%
1950	747	−26.5%
1961	641	−14.2%
1970	487	−24.0%
1980	385	−20.9%
1991	323	−16.1%
2001	312	−3.4%
2011	377	+20.8%
2021	400	+6.1%
Source: Censuses
