= Louis Terrenoire =

French politician and journalist (1908–1992)

- Born: November 10, 1908; 2nd arrondissement of Lyon
- Died: January 9, 1992 (aged 83); Paris
- Resting place: Ceaucé
- Occupation: politician
- Children: Alain Terrenoire

Louis Terrenoire (French pronunciation: [lwi tɛʁnwaʁ]; 10 November 1908, Lyon – 9 January 1992) was a French politician from Union for the New Republic. He was Member of Parliament for Orne's 1st constituency and served as Minister of Information between 1960 and 1961.

== Personal life ==
Louis Terrenoire was born into a family of six children at 22 rue de Condé in Lyon. He was the son of Jean Terrenoire (1876-1949), a traveling salesman and glove maker, and Jeanne Collet (1877-1918). His paternal grandparents were artisans. His son Alain Terrenoire is also a politician.
