= Poběžovice =

- Town
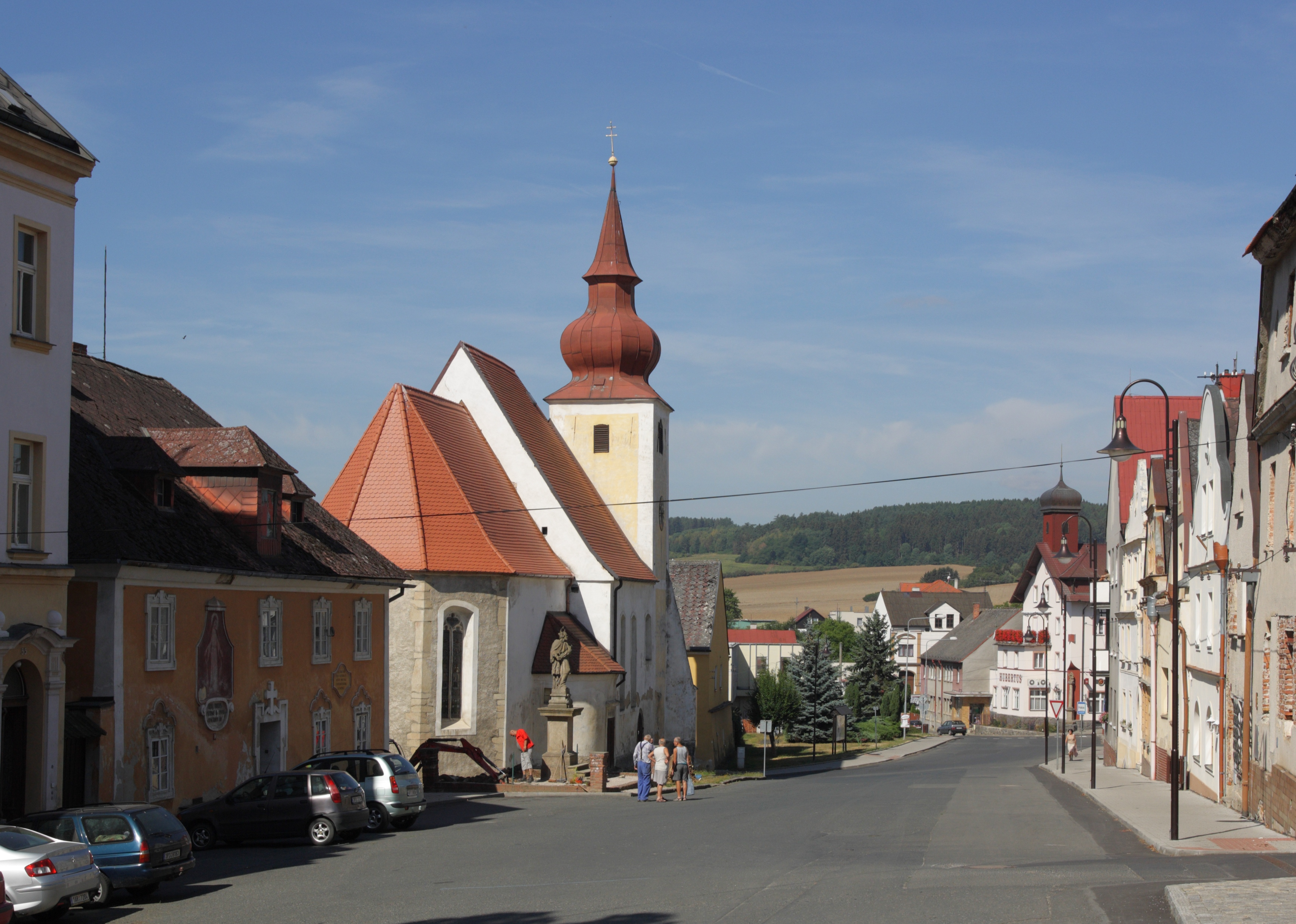
- The square Náměstí Míru

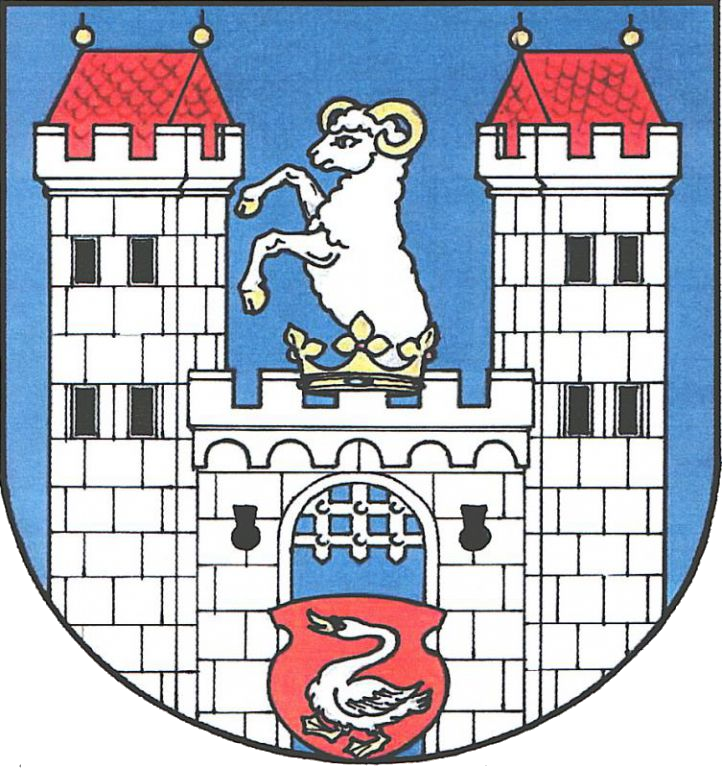
- Flag Coat of arms

- Location in the Czech Republic
- Coordinates: 49°30′N 12°48′E
- Country: Czech Republic
- Region: Plzeň
- District: Domažlice
- First mentioned: 1359

Government
  - Mayor: Martin Kopecký

Area
  - Total: 27.83 km^{2} (10.75 sq mi)
- Elevation: 435 m (1,427 ft)

Population (2026-01-01)
  - Total: 1,541
  - Density: 55.37/km^{2} (143.4/sq mi)
- Time zone: UTC+1 (CET)
  - Summer (DST): UTC+2 (CEST)
- Postal code: 345 22
- Website: www.pobezovice.cz

Poběžovice (Czech pronunciation: [ˈpobjɛʒovɪtsɛ]; until 1918 Ronšperk; German: Ronsperg) is a town in Domažlice District in the Plzeň Region of the Czech Republic. It has about 1,500 inhabitants. The town proper is located on the Pivoňka Stream in the Podčeskoleská Hills.

Poběžovice was probably founded at the beginning of the 14th century and became a town in 1506. The historic town centre is well preserved and is protected as an urban monument zone.

== Administrative division ==
Poběžovice consists of seven municipal parts (in brackets population according to the 2021 census):

- Poběžovice (1,253)
- Ohnišťovice (48)
- Sedlec (60)
- Sezemín (6)
- Šibanov (9)
- Šitboř (68)
- Zámělíč (54)

Sezemín and Šibanov form an exclave of the municipal territory.

== Etymology ==
The name is derived from the personal name Poběh, meaning "the village of Poběh's people". The Old Czech word poběh, from which the personal name arose, meant 'wanderer', but also 'apostate'. The German name Ronsperg is derived from Ramsberg, meaning 'ram hill' in German.

== Geography ==
Poběžovice is located about 12 kilometres (7 mi) northwest of Domažlice and 47 km (29 mi) southwest of Plzeň. It lies mostly in the Podčeskoleská Hills, only a small part of the territory in the south and the exclave lie in the Upper Palatine Forest range. The highest point, located in the exclave, is at 737 m (2,418 ft) above sea level; otherwise, the main part of the municipal territory does not exceed 630 m (2,067 ft). The Pivoňka Stream flows through the town.

== History ==
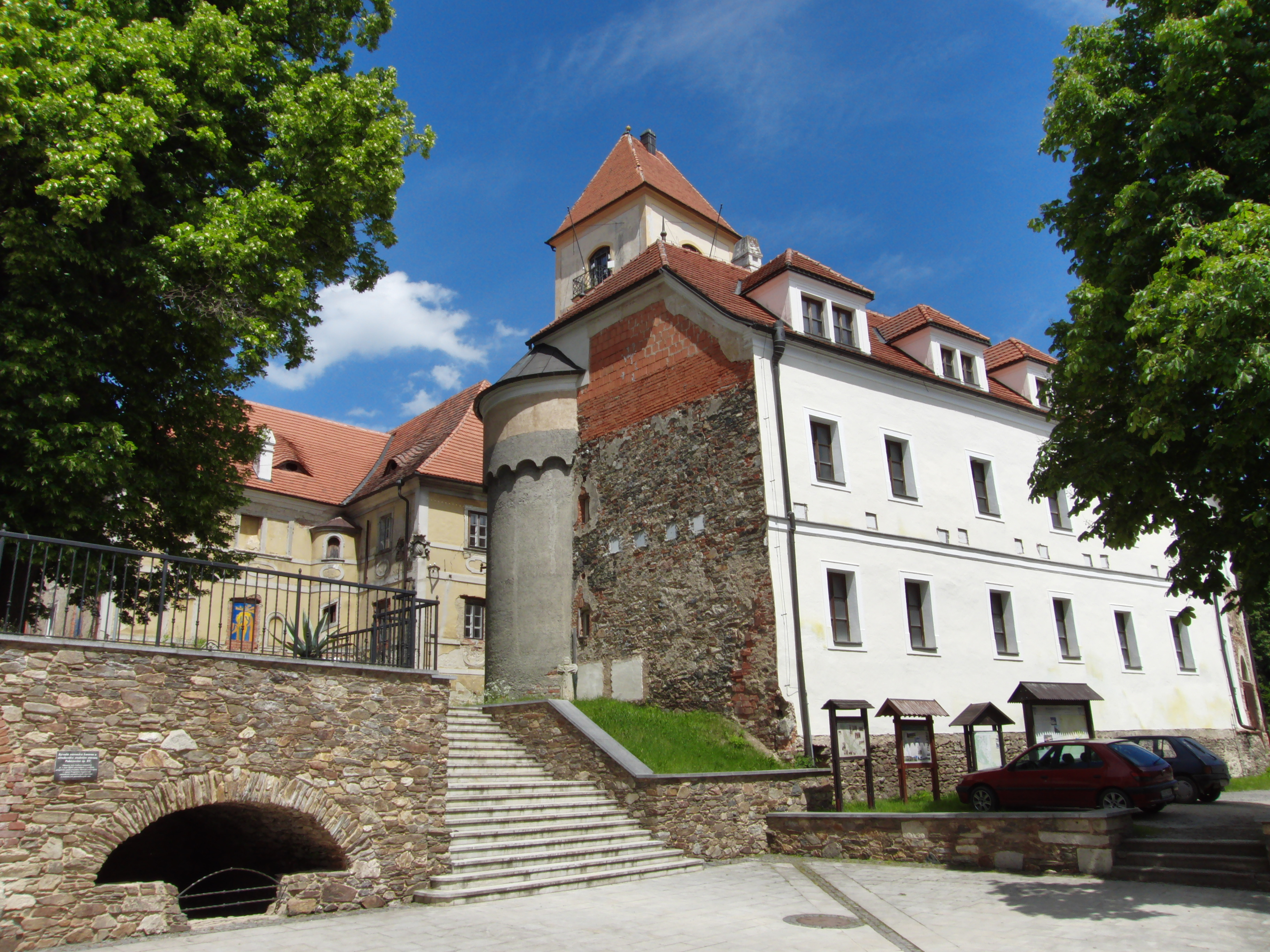
Poběžovice Castle

The continuous settlement of the area is documented by archaeological finds from the 11th century. The village of Poběžovice was probably founded at the beginning of the 14th century. The first written mention of Poběžovice is from 1359, when a small fortress was built. In 1424, it became a market town.

In 1459, the market town was bought by the lesser nobleman Dobrohost of Drštka by Skořice. At the latest in 1470, he left the fortress and had built a late Gothic solid water castle called Nový Ronšperk ('new Ronšperk'). Since then he was known as Dobrohost of Ronšperk, and Poběžovice was renamed Ronšperk. In 1490–1501, he also had built a new large church, the Church of the Assumption of the Virgin Mary, where he was later buried. In 1506, Ronšperk became a town.

In 1864, the castle and the estate were bought by the Coudenhove noble family, later known as Coudenhove-Kalergi family.

== Demographics ==
Historical population

Year	Pop.	±%
1869	3,083	—
1880	3,106	+0.7%
1890	2,970	−4.4%
1900	3,092	+4.1%
1910	3,380	+9.3%

Year	Pop.	±%
1921	3,282	−2.9%
1930	3,190	−2.8%
1950	1,775	−44.4%
1961	1,826	+2.9%
1970	1,627	−10.9%

Year	Pop.	±%
1980	1,724	+6.0%
1991	1,705	−1.1%
2001	1,757	+3.0%
2011	1,637	−6.8%
2021	1,498	−8.5%

Source: Censuses

== Transport ==
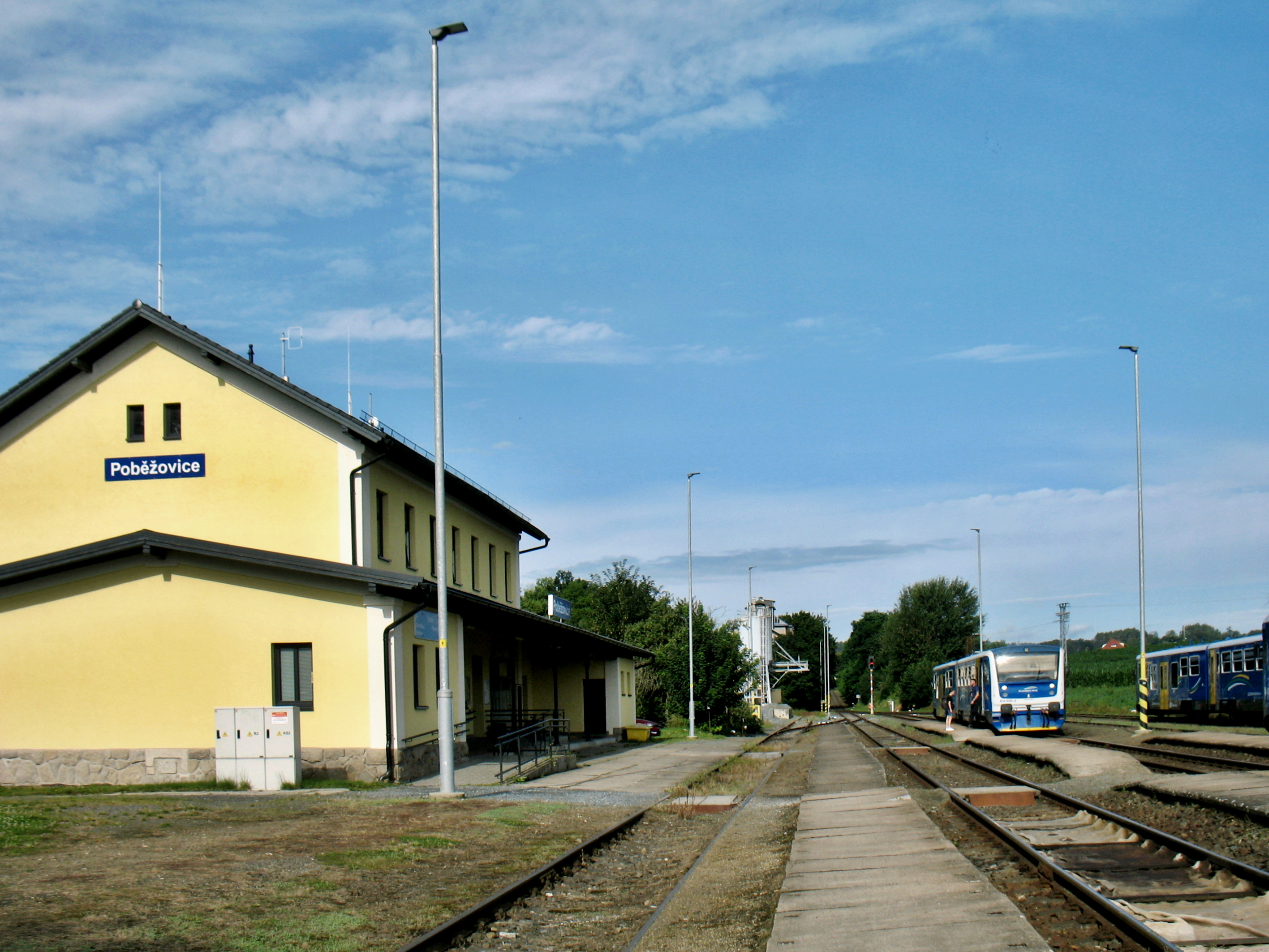
Train station

Poběžovice is located on the railway line Tachov–Domažlice and is the starting point of a local line to Staňkov.

== Sights ==
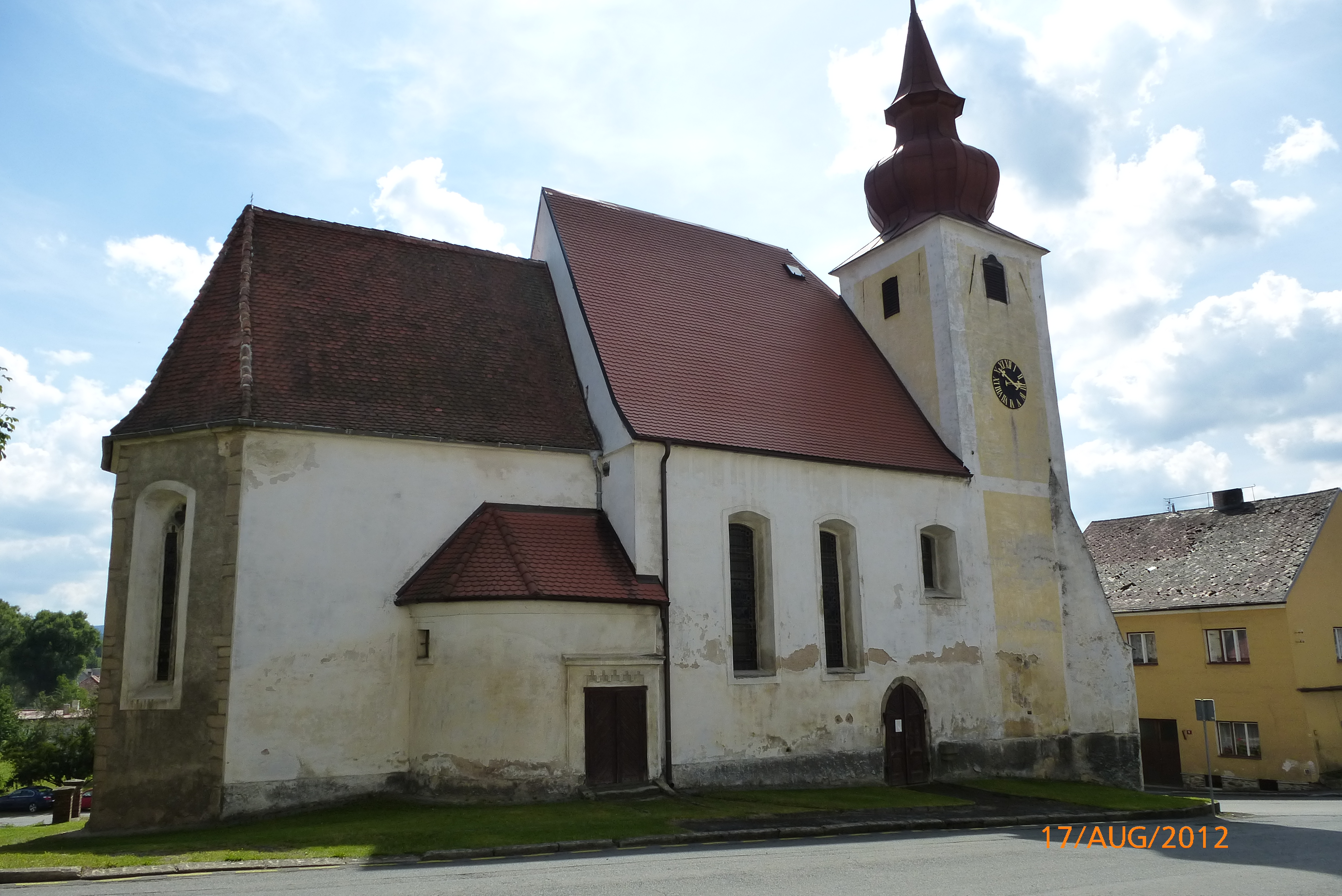
Church of the Assumption of the Virgin Mary

The Poběžovice Castle (formerly Ronšperk Castle) is one of two main landmarks of the town. This medieval late Gothic castle from the end of the 15th century was rebuilt in the Baroque style in 1675. The castle park was founded in 1844. In 1863, the castle was completely reconstructed. In the second half of the 20th century, it gradually fell into disrepair again. The castle is permanently closed due to its poor condition, but in 2020 gradual repairs are planned and the aim is to open it to the public. For its value, it has been protected as a national cultural monument since 2024.

The Church of the Assumption of the Virgin Mary was built in the late Gothic style in 1490. It was rebuilt into its current early Baroque form in the third quarter of the 17th century.

== Notable people ==
- Bezalel Ronsburg (1760–1820), Talmudist and rabbi
- Moses Löb Bloch (1815–1909), Hungarian rabbi
- Carl Holzmann (1849–1914), Austrian architect
- Mitsuko Aoyama (1874–1941), Japanese countess; lived here
- Emil Starkenstein (1884–1942), pharmacologist
- Lilly Steinschneider (1891–1975), first Hungarian woman to qualify as a pilot; lived here
- Richard von Coudenhove-Kalergi (1894–1972), Austrian-Japanese politician and philosopher
- Ida Friederike Görres (1901–1971), Austrian writer

== Twin towns – sister cities ==
Poběžovice is twinned with:

- Radelfingen, Switzerland
- Schönsee, Germany
