= Mitsuko Aoyama =

One of the first Japanese people to immigrate to Europe

- Countess of Coudenhove-Kalergi
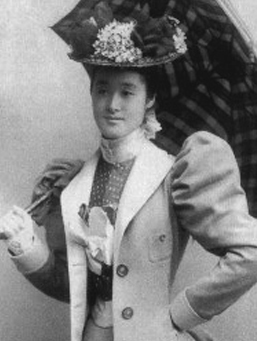
- Born: 7 July 1874; Ushigome, Shinjuku, Tokyo, Empire of Japan
- Died: 27 August 1941 (aged 67); Mödling, Austria
- Noble family: Coudenhove-Kalergi (by marriage)
- Spouse: Heinrich von Coudenhove-Kalergi
- Father: Kihachi Aoyama
- Mother: Tsune Aoyama

Mitsuko Thekla Maria, Countess of Coudenhove-Kalergi (German: Mitsuko Thekla Maria Gräfin von Coudenhove-Kalergi, born Mitsuko Aoyama (青山光子); 7 July 1874 – 27 August 1941) was one of the first Japanese people to immigrate to Europe, after becoming the wife of an Austro-Hungarian diplomat, Heinrich von Coudenhove-Kalergi, in Tokyo. She was the mother of Richard von Coudenhove-Kalergi and the Catholic author Ida Friederike Görres (née von Coudenhove-Kalergi).

== Life ==
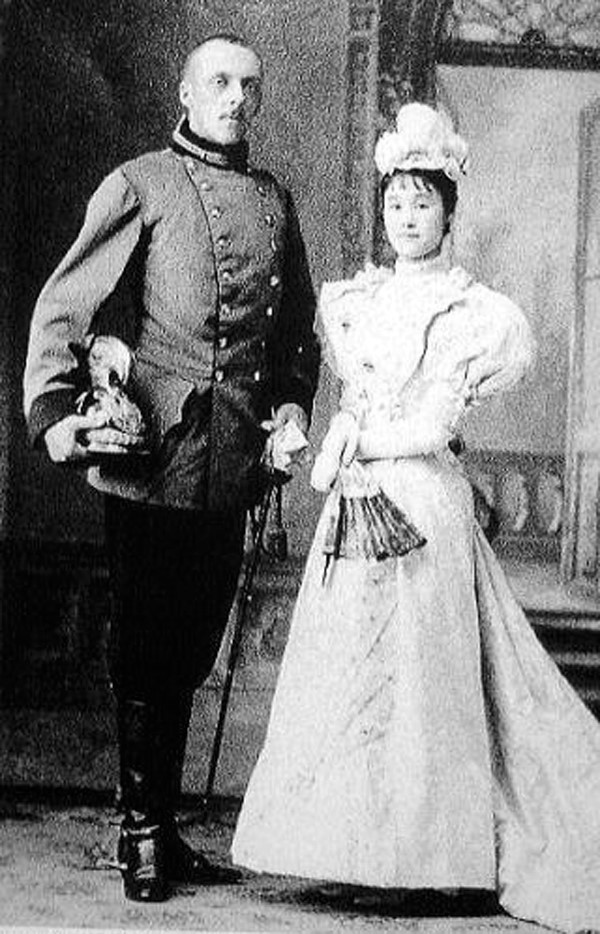
Wedding photograph with her husband in 1892

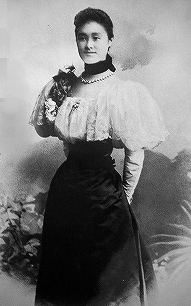
Portrait of Mitsuko

Aoyama was the daughter of Kihachi Aoyama, an antiques and oil dealer in Tokyo. The Aoyama family was also a landowner of large estates.

At the age of 17, she met the Austro-Hungarian diplomat Count Heinrich von Coudenhove (from 1903, Coudenhove-Kalergi) when she came to his aid after his horse slipped on ice (Heinrich often visited her father's shop, not far from the Austrian legation). Heinrich gained her father's permission for her to be employed as a parlour maid in the legation and then, after they fell in love, asked his permission for them to marry. The latter request was refused, but the couple defied him, and married on 16 March 1892 in Tokyo with the consent of the Austrian and Japanese foreign ministries. This left Aoyama disinherited and banned from her father's house.

She converted to Catholicism and was baptized by an anti-masonic Catholic priest, Francois A. Ligneul, in Japan. In 1896, she was received at an imperial reception for foreign diplomats' wives by Empress Eishō (as a commoner, Mitsuko would never have been granted such an audience, but as a countess and ambassador's wife, she was) and again at the end of Heinrich's diplomatic work, shortly afterwards.

The couple then returned to Europe, where Mitsuko and their two sons, Johannes and Richard, took over management of the family estates in Bohemian Ronsperg. Once established, Mitsuko learned French, German, mathematics, geography and history in an attempt to counter the hostility to Heinrich concerning his return with a foreign wife. Five more children would be born to Heinrich and Mitsuko. Heinrich died in 1906 and Mitsuko took over the estates and the children's upbringing and education, while studying law and economics herself.

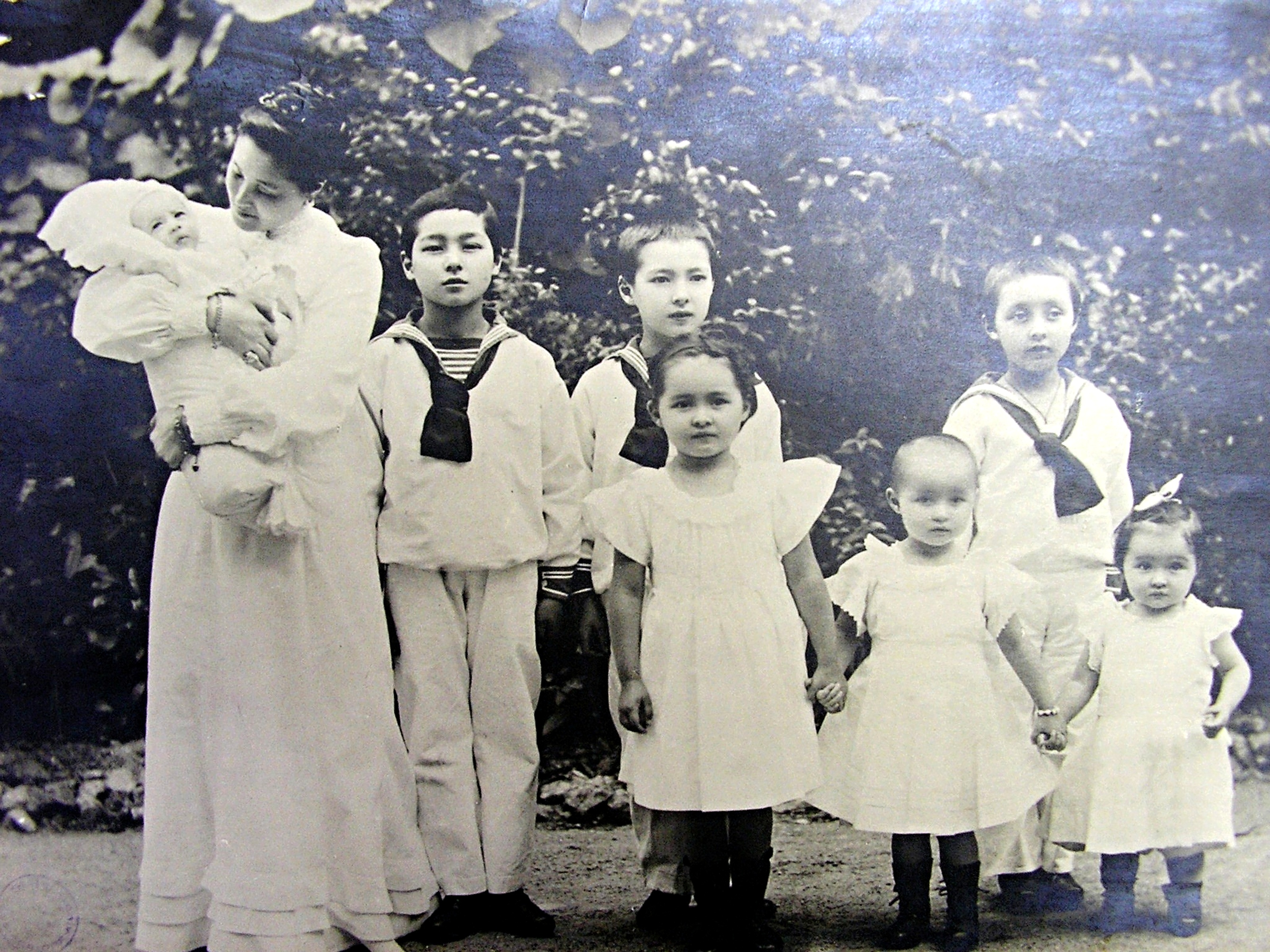
Countess Mitsuko Coudenhove-Kalergi with her seven children in Poběžovice, western Bohemia (1903)

When her second son Richard proposed to marry an actress, Ida Roland, Mitsuko became intensely angry and forbade their marriage. She disparaged Richard and his bride with the words "beggar" and "witch", because actresses were seen as a lowly occupation in Japan. She disinherited him in a certain period from 1916.

Mitsuko never again returned to Japan. After she died in 1941 due to the second stroke she had suffered in her life, she was buried in the Hietzinger Cemetery.

== Children and descendants ==
1. Johann Evangelist Virgilio Graf Coudenhove-Kalergi (1893-1965), born in Tokyo
2. Richard Nikolaus Graf von Coudenhove-Kalergi (1894-1972), born in Tokyo, founder of Paneuropean Union
3. Gerolf Joseph Benedikt Maria Valentin Franz Coudenhove-Kalergi (1896-1978), born in Poběžovice (Bohemia), father of the journalist Barbara Coudenhove-Kalergi and the artist Michael Coudenhove-Kalergi
4. Elisabeth Maria Anna Coudenhove-Kalergi (1898-1936), born in Poběžovice, secretary of Engelbert Dollfuss
5. Olga Marietta Henriette Maria Coudenhove-Kalergi (1900-1976), born in Poběžovice
6. Ida Friederike Görres (1901–1971), born in Poběžovice, writer
7. Karl Heinrich Franz Maria Coudenhove-Kalergi (1903-1987), born in Poběžovice (Bohemia)
