= Kallergis =

Greek noble family from Crete

Kallergis Καλλέργης
- Coat of arms of the Kallergis family

- Approximate reconstruction of the flag of the Kallergis brothers
- Parent family: Phokas family
- Country: Byzantine Empire; Republic of Venice; Ottoman Empire; Russia; Greece
- Current region: Crete; Ionian Islands; Euboea
- Origin: Constantinople, Byzantine Empire
- Founded: 13th century
- Founder: Ioannis Phokas
- Connected families: Vendramin family Crespi family Grimani family

The Kallergis (Greek: Καλλέργης) is a Greek aristocratic family which claims descent from Byzantine Emperor Nikephoros II Phokas, and were at one stage the most powerful noble family of Crete.

== Origin ==
According to later tradition, Emperor Alexios II Komnenos sent twelve noble families to Crete, in order to strengthen the ties between the island and Constantinople. The families were credited important land and administrative privileges. Ioannis Phokas was one of those 12 Byzantine rulers.

The Phokas name changed to "Kallergis" during the Venetian dominion over Crete, which began in the aftermath of the Fourth Crusade. As Richard von Coudenhove-Kalergi describes in his book An idea conquers the world the Kallergis name is composed of the Greek word kallos (=beauty) and ergon (from ergō="work, task, deed, accomplishment, or purpose") [Greek: Καλλ(ι)έργης > Καλλέργης, known in many versions as Kalergis, Calergis, Kallergi, Callergi, Calergi].

Heraldic ensembles containing the Kallergis family coat of arms (bendy argent and azure) can be found all over the island of Crete, in churches and other monuments. The name reappears many times in the turbulent history of Crete but also of modern Greece.

Their prominent position and privileges survived during the Venetian dominion of Crete as they were part of the "privilegiati" (Greek: Αρχοντορωμαίοι) and sometimes of nobiles Veneti. They served many times the Venetian regime but at the same time defended the welfare of the Cretan people, being involved in several uprisings, most notably the Revolt of Alexios Kallergis in the late 13th century, and Revolt of Saint Titus in 1360s.

During the Venetian dominion and after the Ottoman conquest of the island of Crete (1669 AD) many members of the Kallergis family moved to the Ionian Islands, Euboea, Venice, and Russia. From those immigrations, new branches emerged; such as the Caravia family in the Ionian Islands, the Pikoula or Pikoulianos family in Lakonia, the Bakoyannis family in Agrafa-Eurytania, and others. Also, the Kallergis connected with other European noble families through marriages; such as he Venetian families Vendramin, Crespi, and Grimani. The family is also connected to the Palazzo Vendramin-Calergi on the Grand Canal in Venice. Victor Callergi bought the building in 1589 for 36,000 ducats; later it belonged to a Venetian branch of the family which gave its name to it.

== See also ==
- Calliergis, a genus of moths of the family Noctuidae
- Calliergis ramosa, a moth of the family Noctuidae
