= Mayenburg =

Mayenburg is a surname. Notable people with the surname include:

- Marius von Mayenburg (born 1972), German playwright, translator, and instructor.
- Ottomar von Mayenburg (1865–1932), German pharmacist and inventor of toothpaste Chlorodont
- Ruth von Mayenburg (1907–1993), Austrian journalist, writer, and translator
