= Tekkal =

Tekkal is a Turkish word, and it may refer to:

- Düzen Tekkal (born 1978), German journalist and human rights activist of Turkish descent
- Timur Tekkal (born 1981), German rugby union player of Turkish descent
- Tuğba Tekkal (born 1985), German former women's footballer and human rights activist of Turkish descent
