= Franz Marek =

Austrian journalist and politician (1913–1979)

- Born: Ephraim Feuerlicht; 18 April 1913; Przemyśl
- Died: 28 June 1979 (aged 66)
- Years active: 1930s–1970
- Political party: Communist Party of Austria (1934–1970)
- Spouses: Tilly Spiegel (div. 1974); Barbara Coudenhove

Franz Marek (1913–1979) was an Austrian communist politician who edited Weg und Ziel, a monthly journal of the Communist Party of Austria. British historian Eric Hobsbawm described Franz Marek as his hero of the 20th century.

== Early life ==
He was born Ephraim Feuerlicht in Przemyśl, Kingdom of Galicia and Lodomeria, on 18 April 1913 into a Jewish family. They moved to Vienna, and he was raised there in the St. Leopold district. He was one of the founders of a youth organization targeting Zionist junior high school students. Next he became a member of the Hashomer Hatzair, a socialist and Zionist youth movement.

== Career and views ==
In 1934 Marek joined the Communist Party. He exiled to France in 1938 when Austria became part of the Nazi Germany. He was one of the leaders of the French resistance movement and coedited a publication entitled Nouvelles d’Autriche–Österreichische Nachrichten. When France was occupied by the Nazis Marek was arrested and sentenced to death and was freed only after the liberation of Paris in 1944. He could return to Austria in 1946. He assumed several posts in the Communist Party and was appointed editor-in-chief of Weg und Ziel, party's theoretical journal, in 1946. He also edited Wiener Tagebuch. In 1948 Marek was made a member of the political bureau of the Communist Party.

Marek first adhered to the Stalinist approach. In 1960s he became a critic of it and proposed to develop a European version of communism termed as Eurocommunism. He and another party member Ernst Fischer produced many writings on Karl Marx and Vladimir Lenin in 1968 and 1969 to show that the genuine Marxism–Leninism was very different from the Stalinism-based Communism. Marek also published German version of the book Testament of Vargas in 1969 which contained criticisms of the Hungarian economist Eugen Varga.

Due to these views and his stance against the invasion of Czechoslovakia by the Soviet Union he was removed from the Communist Party led by Franz Muhri in 1970.

== Personal life and death ==
Marek was married to Tilly Spiegel who was also a resistance member. They divorced in 1974. He later married journalist Barbara Coudenhove. Marek died of a heart attack on 28 June 1979.

== Legacy ==
In 2017 Marek's memoirs were edited by Maximilian Graf und Sarah Knoll and published under the title Franz Marek. Beruf und Berufung Kommunist by the Mandelbaum Verlag.
