= Cannes Lions =

Advertising industry convention

Coordinates: 43.5509°N 7.01725°E

- The Cannes Lions logo
- Awarded for: Excellence in advertising and creative communications
- Country: United Kingdom
- Presented by: Informa Festivals
- Formerly called: International Advertising Film Festival; International Advertising Festival
- First award: September 1954; 72 years ago
- Website: canneslions.com

The Cannes Lions International Festival of Creativity is an annual festival held at the Palais des Festivals et des Congrès in Cannes, France, focused on creativity, effectiveness, and innovation in the advertising, marketing, and communications industries. Cannes Lions are widely considered to be the most prestigious awards in advertising, (Note: Attributed to multiple references:) and are often referred to as the Oscars of the advertising industry. (Note: Attributed to multiple references:)

First organized in Venice in 1954 as the International Advertising Film Festival, the event moved permanently to Cannes in 1984. Over time, the festival has evolved beyond an awards programme and agency networking event into a broader industry gathering for chief marketing officers, technology leaders, creators, entertainment executives, and entrepreneurs.

== History ==
Inspired by the Cannes Film Festival staged since the late 1940s, a group of European cinema screen advertising contractors set out to establish similar recognition for advertising filmmakers. Organized by the Screen Advertising World Association, the inaugural event, originally named the International Advertising Film Festival, took place in Venice, Italy, in September 1954. It attracted 187 entries from 14 countries, with the first Grand Prix awarded to a three-minute Italian cinema commercial for Chlorodont toothpaste. The festival's trophy, the Lion, was inspired by the winged lion statue at the Piazza San Marco in Venice. The festival relocated to Monte Carlo in 1955 and then to Cannes in 1956. For several decades, the event alternated between Venice and Cannes. In 1984, organizers made Cannes the permanent host city. The decision came after several years during which the festival had been the target of industrial action. Following the move, Italian officials banned the festival from using replicas of the Venetian winged lion, prompting organizers to redesign the trophy into a wingless lion.

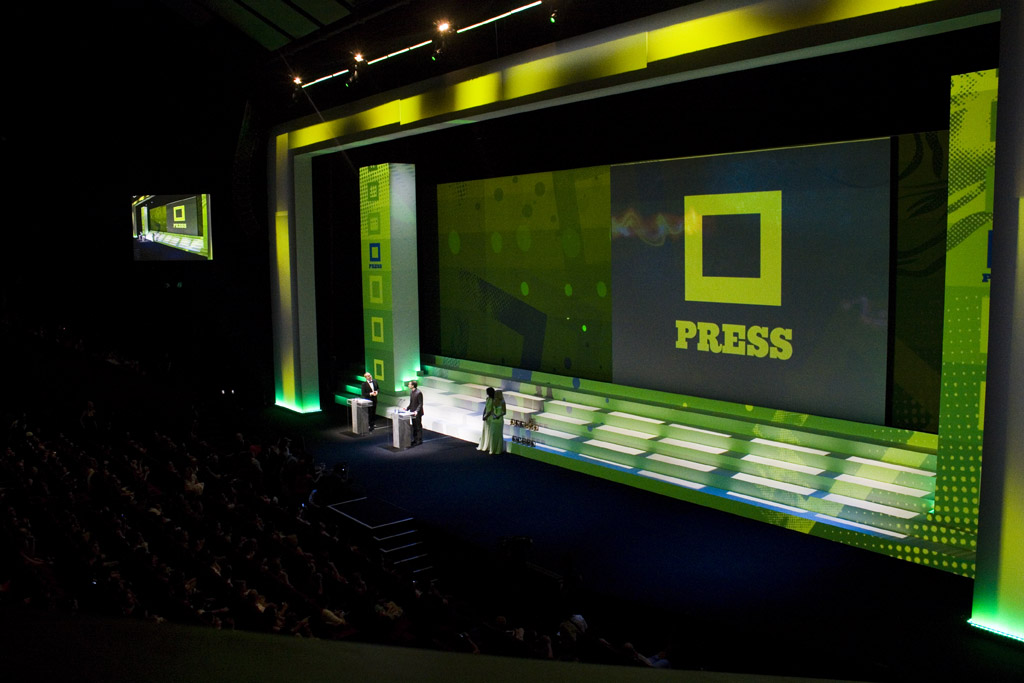
Cannes Lions ceremony in 2009.

In 1987, French executive Roger Hatchuel acquired a financial stake and spearheaded the festival's transformation into a commercial enterprise. In the early 1990s, the festival introduced educational seminars intended to help redress the advertising crisis during the first Gulf War. Having historically focused on television and cinema advertisements, the competition expanded to print entries in 1992, subsequently renaming itself the International Advertising Festival. In August 2004, EMAP (later Ascential) acquired the festival for £52.5 million, ending Hatchuel's 17-year tenure. To reflect a broader focus on creative communications rather than just traditional advertising, the event was rebranded as the Cannes Lions International Festival of Creativity in 2011.

Due to the COVID-19 pandemic, the 2020 festival was canceled after an initial postponement. Cannes Lions returned in 2021 as a fully digital event before resuming as an in-person gathering on the French Riviera in June 2022. Following Russia's invasion of Ukraine, Cannes Lions banned entries and delegates from Russian organizations from the 2022 festival, while waiving fees for Ukrainian delegates and refunding submission fees for Ukrainian agencies. In October 2024, Informa completed its £1.2 billion acquisition of Ascential, the festival's owner at the time.

== Awards ==
=== Structure ===
Cannes Lions are widely considered to be the most prestigious awards in the advertising industry, and are often referred to as the sector's Oscars. In 2011, Cannes Lions received a record 28,828 entries, the highest in its 58-year history at the time. Submissions reached a new peak in 2016 at over 43,000, up 7% from the previous year. Following the cancellation of the 2020 event due to the COVID-19 pandemic, the 2021 iteration accepted work spanning both 2020 and 2021, recording 29,074 entries from 90 countries, a 6% decline compared with 2019. In 2026, total entries dropped by 25.5% to 20,050 after organizers introduced stricter eligibility and verification requirements following the 2025 cheating scandal, including enhanced fact-checking, stricter client sign-off procedures, and bans on agencies that submit fake or manipulated work.

While the festival's primary purpose is to recognize creative advertising, it has also developed into a networking event for marketers, agency executives, emerging creatives, creators, and trade journalists. The competition is divided into multiple Lions categories covering different areas of creative work. The awards evolve each year to reflect changes in the creative communications industry and how brands, agencies, and platforms shape culture, business, and society. Following criticism over rising costs, the proliferation of award categories, and the festival's growing focus beyond creative advertising, Cannes Lions announced a major overhaul for 2018, shortening the event from longer than a week to five days, reducing the price of its full delegate pass by €900, removing more than 120 award subcategories, and limiting each campaign to 6 award entries. The competition comprises various award categories, each presenting distinct levels of recognition, beginning with shortlisted entries, followed by Bronze, Silver, and Gold Lions. A Grand Prix may then be selected from the Gold-winning entries for the best overall work in the category, but it is not awarded if the jury determines that no submission meets the required standard.

=== Integrity ===
The festival has historically faced issues with scam or ghost ads created solely for awards. In 1995, jury chairman Frank Lowe stirred controversy by refusing to award a Grand Prix, maintaining that none of the submitted work met the required standard. In 2000, Lowe Lintas Sydney made an unprecedented move by returning two Bronze Lions after an internal investigation found the winning entries to be unauthorized or otherwise ineligible. In 2002, the festival stripped DPZ Propaganda of two Gold Lions after determining that its Johnson & Johnson KY advertisements had not been approved by the client and that the agency had lost the account three years earlier. In response to recurring concerns over deceptive entries, Cannes Lions introduced policies on scam ads in 2009, providing for sanctions against the individual creatives responsible rather than their agencies. The following year, the competition stripped Ogilvy Mexico of the Press Grand Prix for its Mattel Scrabble campaign 45 minutes before the ceremony after discovering that the campaign had previously failed to make the shortlist when entered in 2008; the award was subsequently presented to AlmapBBDO's Billboard entry.

In 2011, the festival withdrew a Silver Lion in Press and a Bronze Lion in Outdoor from Brazilian agency Moma Propaganda over a Kia Motors campaign criticized for overtones of lust and pedophilia. The revocation occurred after the automaker publicly confirmed it had neither approved nor commissioned the advertisements. This marked the first time Cannes Lions banned the responsible creatives from entering future work, imposing a one-year ban for the 2012 festival to the five individuals credited at Moma Propaganda. In 2025, the competition revoked 12 awards won by DM9, a Brazilian subsidiary of DDB, most notably the Creative Data Grand Prix, after determining that its case film contained AI-generated and manipulated content, including altered CNN Brasil footage. The festival subsequently introduced new integrity standards for 2026, including mandatory AI disclosure, enhanced verification procedures, and bans of up to three years for deliberate misrepresentation. Ad Age reported that 22 executives interviewed for its investigation – most of whom had served on Cannes Lions juries or participated in award submissions – described bribery, vote manipulation, and collusion among jurors as widespread and worsening. Agency executives reported that the 2026 submission process became significantly more burdensome due to mandatory client sign-off, proof-of-impact documentation, and a dual-layer human and AI fact-checking system for campaign claims.

== Controversies ==
In the 2010s, Cannes Lions faced growing scrutiny over its environmental impact, including its carbon footprint from international travel and waste from single-use plastics and discarded promotional materials. In 2019, members of Extinction Rebellion were arrested after blockading the Palais des Festivals and staging protests on the beachfront. Three years later, Greenpeace launched a guerrilla campaign in Cannes targeting the advertising industry's ties to fossil fuel companies. During the festival's opening ceremony, Gustav Martner, a 2007 Gold Lion winner and former jury member, returned his award in protest, unfurling a banner that read, "No awards on a dead planet."

Cannes Lions has faced criticism over its handling of sexual misconduct in the advertising industry. Cindy Gallop has recounted experiencing harassment at the festival. In 2018, the event drew criticism for not including a dedicated panel on the issue amid the wider MeToo movement. Following reports of sexual harassment and assault at the 2024 festival, Cannes Lions introduced designated "Safe Zones" in 2025, though the measures faced criticism and prompted an industry petition for stronger protocols.

== Bibliography ==
- Jones, John Philip, ed. (2000). Advertising Organizations and Publications: A Resource Guide. Thousand Oaks, California: Sage Publications. doi:10.4135/9781452220444. ISBN 978-0-7619-1237-8. LCCN 99050479. OCLC 42597795. S2CID 142737548.
- Rose, Frank (2012). The Art of Immersion: How the Digital Generation Is Remaking Hollywood, Madison Avenue, and the Way We Tell Stories. New York City: W. W. Norton & Company. ISBN 978-0-393-08079-7. LCCN 2010038676. OCLC 748648665. S2CID 191258400.
- Perrey, Jesko; Spillecke, Dennis (2013) [1st pub. 2012]. Retail Marketing and Branding: A Definitive Guide to Maximizing ROI (2nd ed.). Chichester: John Wiley & Sons. doi:10.1002/9781119207900. ISBN 978-1-118-48952-9. LCCN 2012537403. OCLC 824146337.
- Tungate, Mark (2013) [1st pub. 2007]. Adland: A Global History of Advertising (2nd ed.). London: Kogan Page. ISBN 978-0-7494-6431-8. LCCN 2013014332. OCLC 841198198.
- Grybś, Marta (2014). "Creating New Trends in International Marketing Communication". Journal of Economics and Management. 15. University of Economics in Katowice: 155–173. ISSN 2719-9975. OCLC 8598127058. S2CID 152527280. ProQuest 1661722192. Archived from the original on 28 July 2026.
- Davisson, Amber; Booth, Paul, eds. (2016). Controversies in Digital Ethics. New York City: Bloomsbury Academic. doi:10.5040/9781501310553. ISBN 978-1-5013-1056-0. LCCN 2015028754. OCLC 910702581. S2CID 192232004.
- O'Sullivan-Gavin, Susan A.; Amazeen, Michelle (2016). "The Advertising Industry in the Social Media Age: The Ethical and Legal Implications of Unsanctioned Rogue or Scam Ads". Journal of Law, Business and Ethics. 22. La Verne, California: Pacific Southwest Academy of Legal Studies in Business: 9–25. ISSN 2163-9558. OCLC 728673224. Archived from the original on 30 July 2026 – via HeinOnline.
- Cochoy, Franck; Hagberg, Johan; McIntyre, Magdalena; Sörum, Niklas, eds. (2017). Digitalizing Consumption: How Devices Shape Consumer Culture. London: Routledge. doi:10.4324/9781315647883. ISBN 978-1-317-29935-6. LCCN 2019724883. OCLC 988869591. S2CID 217186298.
- Galan-Ladero, M. Mercedes; Alves, Helena M., eds. (2019). Case Studies on Social Marketing: A Global Perspective. Cham, Switzerland: Springer Nature Switzerland. doi:10.1007/978-3-030-04843-3. ISBN 978-3-030-04843-3. ISSN 2192-810X. LCCN 2019737793. OCLC 1086610338. S2CID 256268678.
- Hardy, Jonathan (2021). Branded Content: The Fateful Merging of Media and Marketing. Abingdon-on-Thames: Routledge. doi:10.4324/9781315641065. ISBN 978-1-315-64106-5. LCCN 2021008967. OCLC 1245959249.
- Jung, Timothy; Dalton, Jeremy, eds. (2021). XR Case Studies: Using Augmented Reality and Virtual Reality Technology in Business. Cham, Switzerland: Springer Cham. doi:10.1007/978-3-030-72781-9. ISBN 978-3-030-72780-2. ISSN 2192-810X. OCLC 1346496583.
- Richards, Jef I. (2022). A History of Advertising: The First 300,000 Years. Lanham, Maryland: Rowman & Littlefield. ISBN 978-1-5381-4121-2. LCCN 2021038849. OCLC 1264176368.
- Tavory, Iddo; Prelat, Sonia; Ronen, Shelly (2022). Tangled Goods: The Practical Life of Pro Bono Advertising. Chicago: University of Chicago Press. doi:10.7208/chicago/9780226820170.003.0001. ISBN 978-0-226-82018-7. LCCN 2021057022. OCLC 1274201507.
- Meléndez-Rodríguez, Saraí; Roca, David (2023). "Sick of Awards: Hidden Costs of Signaling for Advertising Creatives". International Journal of Advertising. 42 (8). Advertising Association: 1295–1314. doi:10.1080/02650487.2023.2175301. ISSN 1759-3948. OCLC 10309254461. S2CID 256575307.
- Belch, George E.; Belch, Michael A. (2024) [1st pub. 1990]. Advertising and Promotion: An Integrated Marketing Communications Perspective (13th ed.). New York City: McGraw Hill. ISBN 978-1-266-85466-8. LCCN 2023013592. OCLC 1374936123.
- Swiatek, Lukasz (2024). Major Reward and Recognition Events: Transformations and Critical Perspectives. London, New York City: Routledge. doi:10.4324/9781003106630. ISBN 978-1-00-093833-3. LCCN 2023014645. OCLC 1385505611.
