= Marina Fischer-Kowalski =

Austrian sociologist and social ecologist (born 1946)

Marina Fischer-Kowalski (born 1946) is an Austrian sociologist and social ecologist and a professor emeritus of the University of Klagenfurt, currently teaching at the University of Natural Resources and Life Sciences, Vienna, the University of Klagenfurt and the University of Vienna. She is known for founding the Vienna School of Social Ecology and for her pioneering work on the widely used metric for material and energy flows to complement economic accounting. Fischer-Kowalski works on socio-environmental change, sustainable development and the Anthropocene.

== Education ==
Fischer-Kowalski was born 1946 in Vienna as the daughter of the political activist Ruth von Mayenburg and the politician and writer Ernst Fischer. She received her PhD in sociology at the University of Vienna in 1971 and a postgraduate degree in social sciences from the Institute for Advanced Studies in 1973. In 1985, Fischer-Kowalski was awarded the habilitation in sociology at the University of Graz.

== Career ==
Fischer-Kowalski was assistant professor in sociology at the Institute for Advanced Studies in Vienna (1972–84) and Austrian delegate to and consultant of OECD in Paris, working on comparative studies between countries for quality of life, social inequality and gender. In 1986, the Institute for Interdisciplinary Studies of Austrian Universities (IFF), later a faculty of the University of Klagenfurt, called her to found an Institute for Social Ecology, which she directed from 1987 until 2014.

Fischer-Kowalski taught as a visiting professor at the University Federal de Rio de Janeiro, Brazil (2003), Yale University, USA (2002), Roskilde University, Denmark (1997), at Griffith University, Australia (1996) and the London School of Economics (1992). Currently she is senior researcher at the Institute for Social Ecology, University for Natural Resources and Life Sciences in Vienna.

Throughout her career, Fischer-Kowalski has been combining a scientific agenda with civil activity. She engaged in the Austrian student movement in the 1960s towards university reform, the Czech liberation movement in 1968 and 1989, parental self-organization of child care institutions and free schools in Vienna and acted as chair of Greenpeace Austria 1994–2000. She was a founding member of UNEP's International Resource Panel which Ernst v. Weizsäcker initiated to combat the global overuse of natural resources. Currently, she is engaged in bringing about a sustainability transition on the island of Samothrace, Greece.

== Scientific contribution ==
Fischer-Kowalski's research interests cut across various disciplines (among them Sociology, Economics, Biology, Energetics, History), where she is seeking for interdisciplinary insights and solutions in team collaborations. She has contributed to the interlinkage of long term social and environmental change; material and energy flow analysis and resource efficiency; socio-ecological regime transitions; energy, society and labor and transdisciplinary approaches to socio-ecological sustainability transitions. Her main achievements consist in establishing theoretical foundations and a core set of empirical work in the field of Social Ecology on the one hand and developing internationally accepted methodological standards and standardized data bases for material and energy flow accounting (within the European Union and Japan, and recently on a global level). These data serve as a biophysical complement to economic accounting.

== Memberships, honors and awards ==
Fischer-Kowalski is member of the Austrian and the International Sociological Association and has been deputy chair of its Research Committee Society and Environment (1998–2002). She was among the founding members of the International Society for Industrial Ecology (of which she has been president 2007–2009). She is member of and has been president of the International Society for Ecological Economics (2013–2018). She acted as Chair of the Scientific Advisory Board of the Potsdam Institute for Climate Impact Research (PIK) (2002–2010).

Fischer-Kowalski received the Austrian State Award for Arts and Sciences, First Class (2015), the Austrian Ministry of Science Award for transdisciplinary sustainability research (2016) and became Honorary Citizen of the Municipality of Samothrace, Greece, for scientific support to its sustainability pathway (2012). The University of Klagenfurt awarded her its Ring of Honour (2017). In 2017, she received the Society Prize of the International Society for Industrial Ecology for outstanding contributions to the field.

Fischer-Kowalski serves as associate editor of The Anthropocene Review (Sage), the Journal for BioPhysical Economics and Resource Quality (Elsevier) and Ecology, Economy and Society, the Journal of the Indian Society for Ecological Economics (Elsevier).
