= DZW =

DZW may refer to:

- DZW, DS100 station code for Zwickau Hauptbahnhof
- Dzw, station code for Delfzijl West railway station
- Shortening of Die ZahnarztWoche, for which Ottomar von Mayenburg wrote for
