= Srbice (Teplice District) =

- Municipality
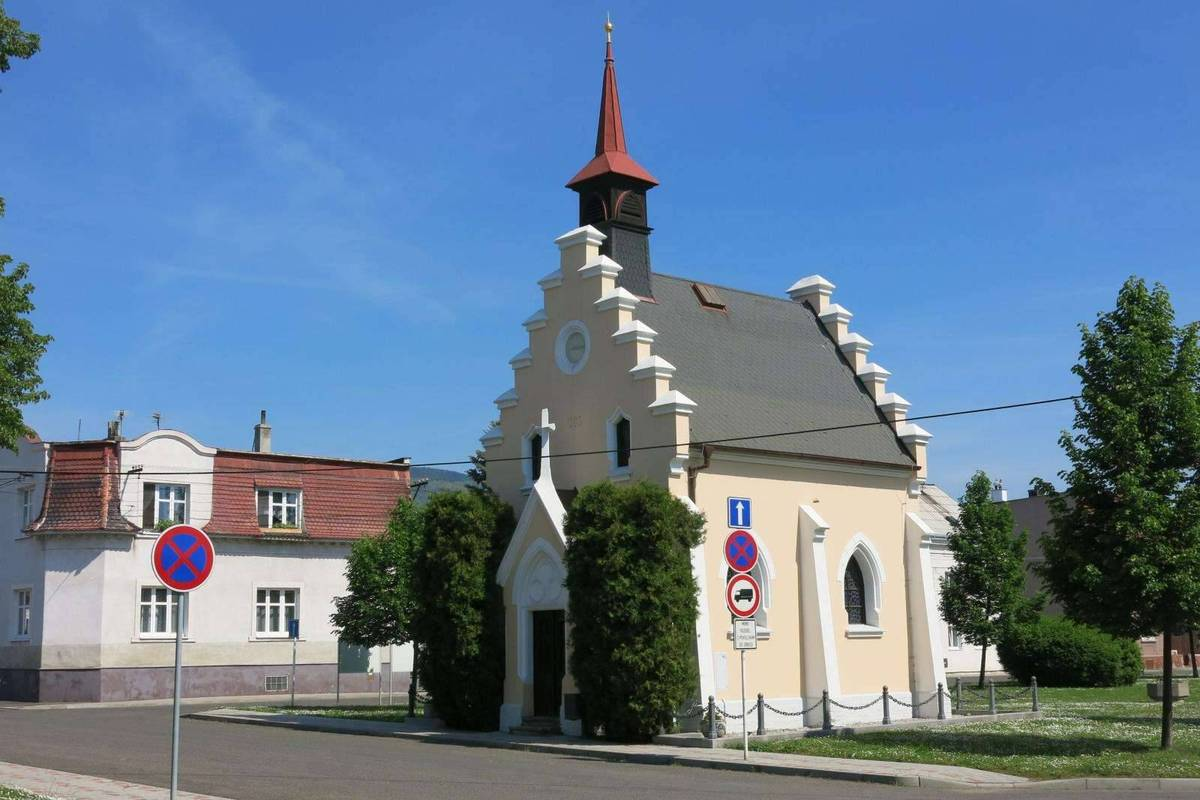
- Chapel of Saints Philip and James

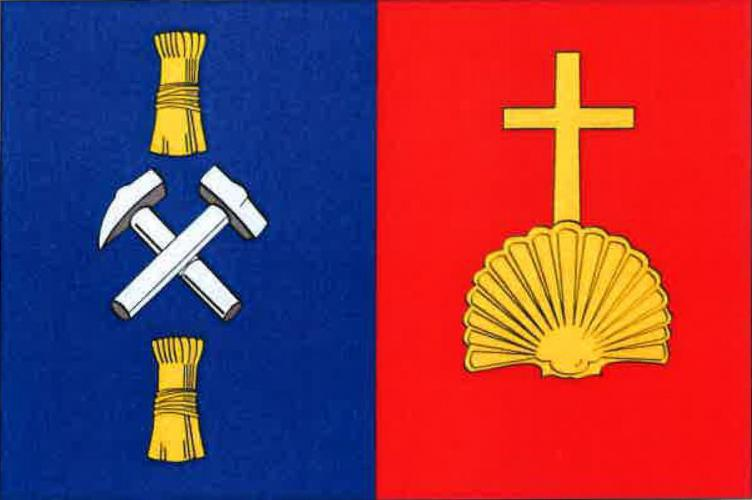
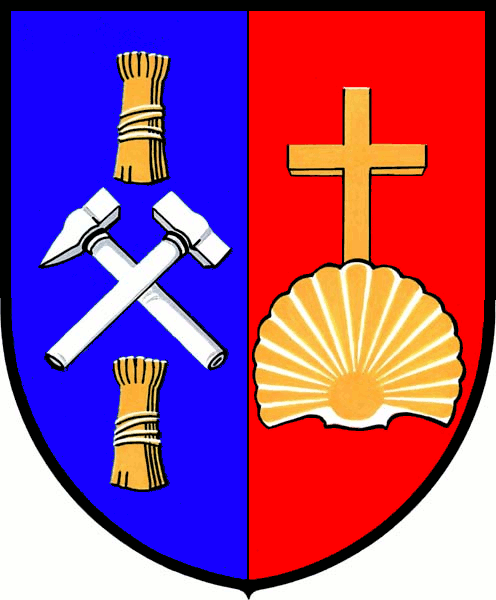
- Flag Coat of arms

- Location in the Czech Republic
- Coordinates: 50°39′39″N 13°52′10″E
- Country: Czech Republic
- Region: Ústí nad Labem
- District: Teplice
- First mentioned: 1542

Area
  - Total: 2.13 km^{2} (0.82 sq mi)
- Elevation: 203 m (666 ft)

Population (2026-01-01)
  - Total: 517
  - Density: 243/km^{2} (629/sq mi)
- Time zone: UTC+1 (CET)
  - Summer (DST): UTC+2 (CEST)
- Postal code: 417 13
- Website: www.srbice.cz

Srbice (German: Serbitz) is a municipality and village in Teplice District in the Ústí nad Labem Region of the Czech Republic. It has about 500 inhabitants.

Srbice lies approximately 5 kilometres (3 mi) north-east of Teplice, 12 km (7 mi) west of Ústí nad Labem, and 74 km (46 mi) north-west of Prague.

== Demographics ==
Historical population
Year	Pop.	±%
1869	237	—
1880	426	+79.7%
1890	533	+25.1%
1900	508	−4.7%
1910	621	+22.2%
1921	512	−17.6%
1930	735	+43.6%
1950	386	−47.5%
1961	392	+1.6%
1970	363	−7.4%
1980	351	−3.3%
1991	265	−24.5%
2001	243	−8.3%
2011	297	+22.2%
2021	458	+54.2%
Source: Censuses

== Notable people ==
- Ruth von Mayenburg (1907–1993), Austrian journalist, writer and translator
