= Richard von Coudenhove-Kalergi =

Politician and philosopher (1894–1972)

- Count of Coudenhove-Kalergi
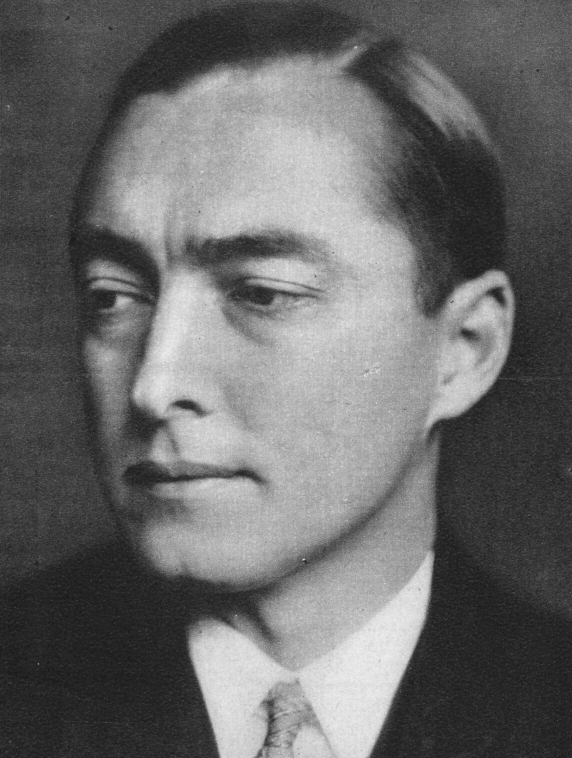
- Coudenhove-Kalergi in 1930
- Born: Aoyama Eijiro; 16 November 1894; Tokyo, Japan
- Died: 27 July 1972 (aged 77); Schruns, Austria
- Noble family: Coudenhove-Kalergi
- Father: Heinrich von Coudenhove-Kalergi
- Mother: Mitsuko Aoyama
- Occupation: Politician

Richard Nikolaus Eijiro, Count of Coudenhove-Kalergi (German: Richard Nikolaus Eijiro Graf von Coudenhove-Kalergi; Japanese: リヒャルト・ニコラウス・栄次郎・クーデンホーフ＝カレルギー伯爵, romanized: Richyaruto Nikorausu Eijirō Kūdenhōfu-Karerugī Hakushaku; 16 November 1894 – 27 July 1972), was a politician, philosopher, and count of Coudenhove-Kalergi. A pioneer of European integration, he served as the founding president of the Paneuropean Union for 49 years. His parents were Heinrich von Coudenhove-Kalergi, an Austro-Hungarian diplomat, and Mitsuko Aoyama, the daughter of an oil merchant, antiques-dealer and major landowner in Tokyo. His childhood name in Japan was Eijiro Aoyama (青山 栄次郎). Being a native Austrian-Hungarian citizen, he became a Czechoslovak citizen in 1919 and then took French citizenship from 1939 until his death.

His first book, Pan-Europa, was published in 1923 and contained a membership form for the Pan-Europa movement, which held its first Congress in 1926 in Vienna. In 1927, Aristide Briand was elected honorary president of the Pan-Europa movement. Public figures who attended Pan-Europa congresses included Albert Einstein, Thomas Mann and Sigmund Freud.

Coudenhove-Kalergi was the first recipient of the Charlemagne Prize in 1950. The 1972–1973 academic year at the College of Europe was named in his honour. Coudenhove-Kalergi proposed Beethoven's "Ode to Joy" as the music for the European Anthem. He also proposed a Europe Day, a European postage stamp, and many artifacts for the movement (e.g. badges and pennants).

== Family roots ==
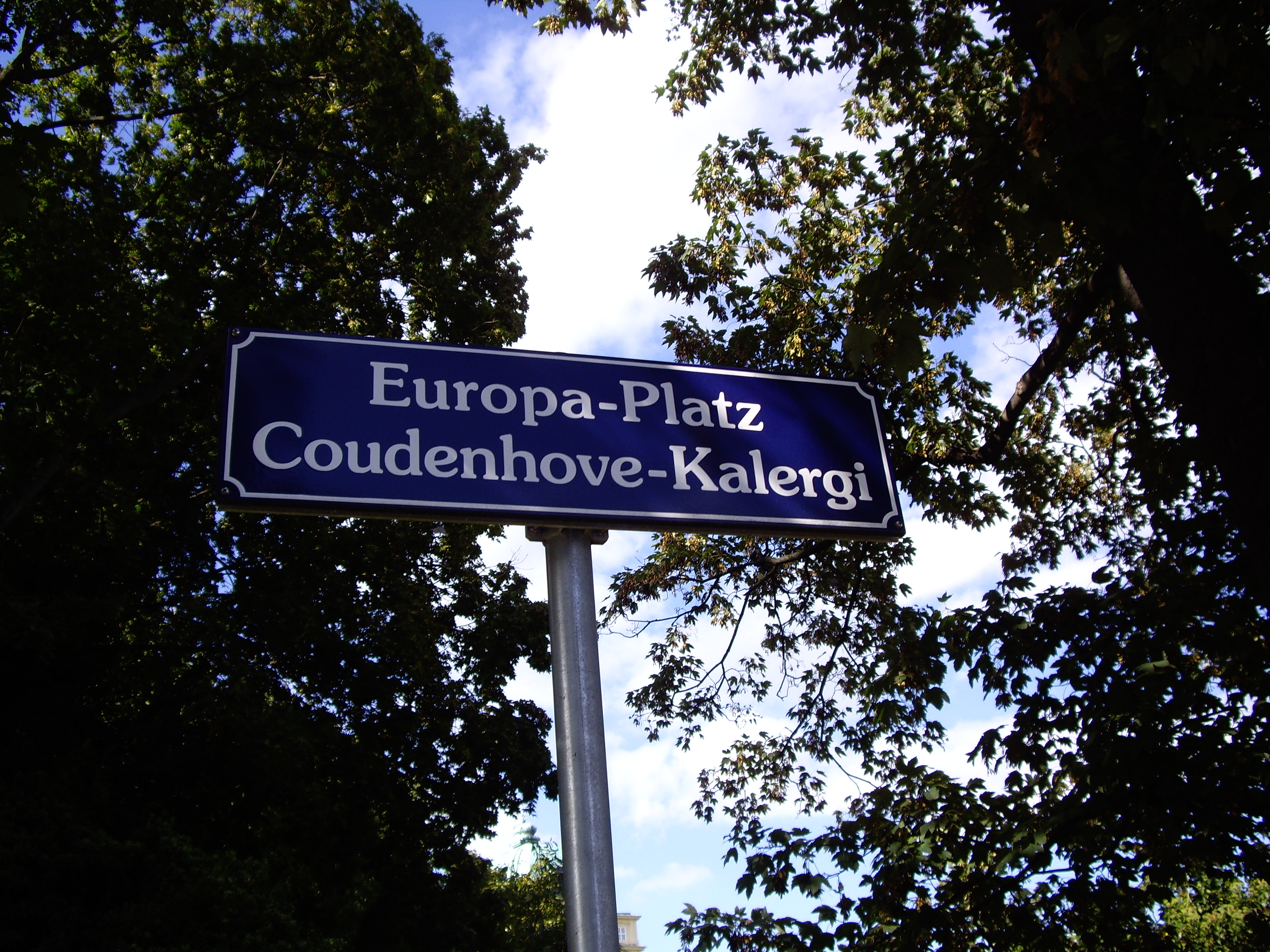
Europa-Platz – Coudenhove-Kalergi in Klosterneuburg, Austria

Coudenhove-Kalergi was the second son of Heinrich von Coudenhove-Kalergi (1859–1906), an Austro-Hungarian count and diplomat. His mother was Mitsuko Aoyama (1874–1941). His father, who spoke sixteen languages and embraced travel as the only means of prolonging life yet died in his forties, had prematurely abandoned a career in the Austrian diplomatic service that took him to Athens, Constantinople, Rio de Janeiro and Tokyo, to devote himself to study and writing.

Coudenhove-Kalergi's parents met when his mother helped the Austro-Hungarian diplomat after he fell off a horse while riding in Japan. In commenting on their union, Whittaker Chambers described the future originator of Pan-Europe as "practically a Pan-European organization himself." He elaborated: "The Coudenhoves were a wealthy Flemish family that fled to Austria during the French Revolution. The Kalergis were a wealthy Greek family from Crete. The line has been further crossed with Poles, Norwegians, Balts, French and Germans". The Kalergis family roots claim their descent from Byzantine royalty via Venetian aristocracy, connecting with the Phokas imperial dynasty. In 1300, Coudenhove-Kalergi's ancestor Alexios Phokas-Kalergis signed the treaty that made Crete a dominion of Venice.

During his childhood, Coudenhove-Kalergi's mother had read aloud to him Momotarō and other Japanese fairy tales.

== Youth and education ==
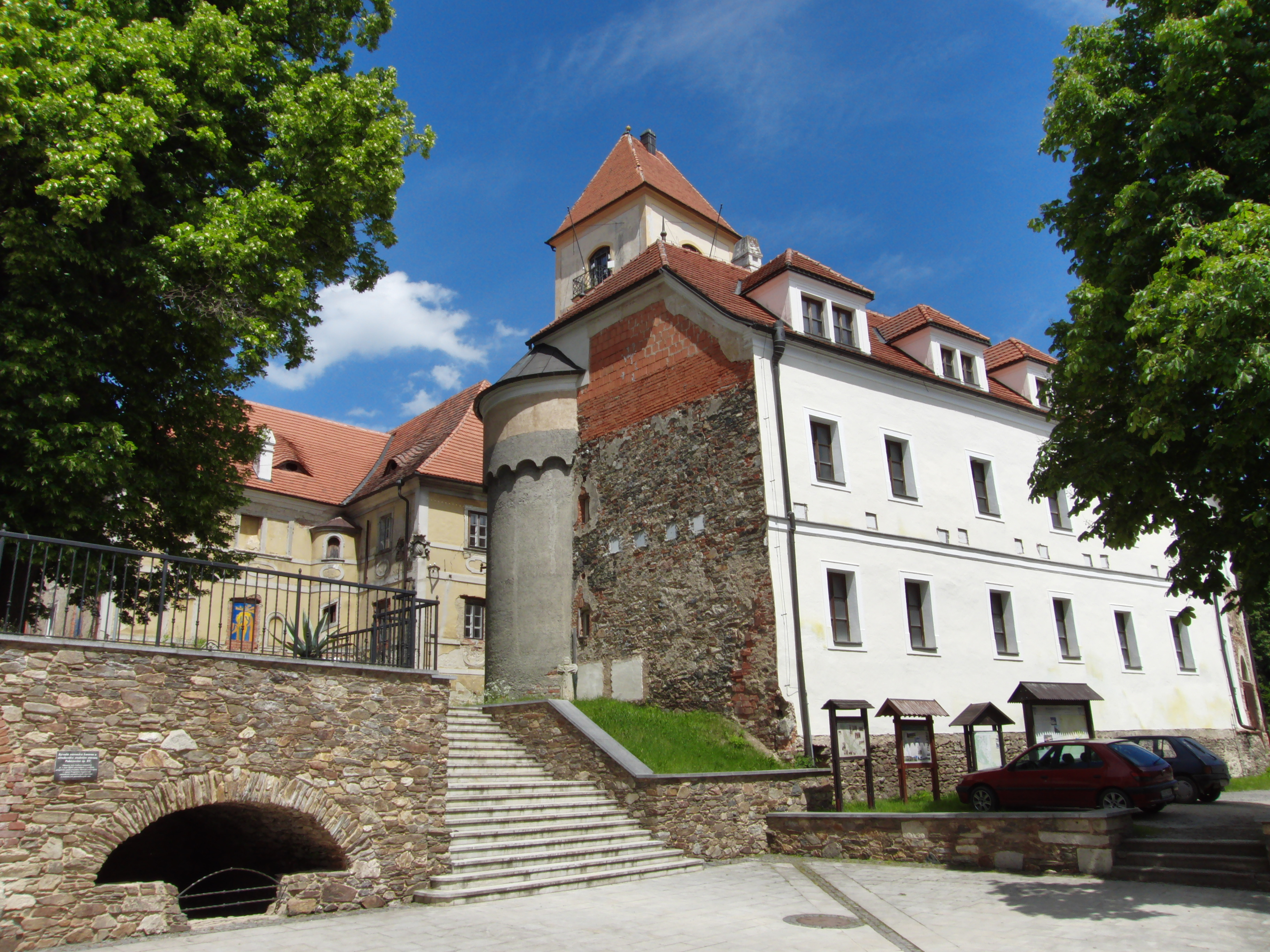
The Poběžovice (Ronsperg) castle, his childhood home. Damaged during the Second World War, the repairs were overseen by a German from Japan Masumi Schmidt-Muraki.

Coudenhove-Kalergi spent his adolescence on Bohemian family estates in Ronsperg, known today as Poběžovice. His father personally taught his two sons Russian and Hungarian and toughened them both physically and morally. He took them on long walks in all weather, made them sleep on straw mattresses and take cold showers, and taught them to shoot and fence so well that no one would ever dare challenge them. He also took them to Mass every Sunday. On every Good Friday, as the liturgy came to the exhortation "oremus et pro perfidis Judaeis" ("Let us also pray for the perfidious Jews"), the old count allegedly rose and walked out of the church in a protest against this expression of antisemitism.

Coudenhove-Kalergi studied at the Augustiner-Gymnasium in Brixen before attending the Theresianische Akademie in Vienna from 1908 until 1913. He obtained his doctorate in philosophy with a thesis on Die Objectivität als Grundprinzip der Moral (Objectivity as the Fundamental Principle of Morals) in 1917 from the University of Vienna.

During his student years, Coudenhove-Kalergi married the famous Jewish Viennese actress Ida Roland in April 1915. His marriage to a divorcée thirteen years his senior, and a commoner, caused a temporary split with his family. His mother Mitsuko did not accept Ida, considering her a "beggar living on the riverbank," a traditional Japanese point of view against actors and performers. His mother, as head of the family, banned him from the family temporarily, but relented when Coudenhove-Kalergi became renowned for his pan-European concept.

== Personal philosophy ==
He was Aristocratic in his origins and this reflected in his ideas, Coudenhove-Kalergi identified and collaborated with such politicians as Engelbert Dollfuss, Kurt Schuschnigg, Otto von Habsburg, Winston Churchill, and Charles de Gaulle. His ideal political constituent was a gentleman who must respect and protect ladies, a person adhering to honesty, fair play, courtesy, and rational discourse.

== Pan-European political activist ==
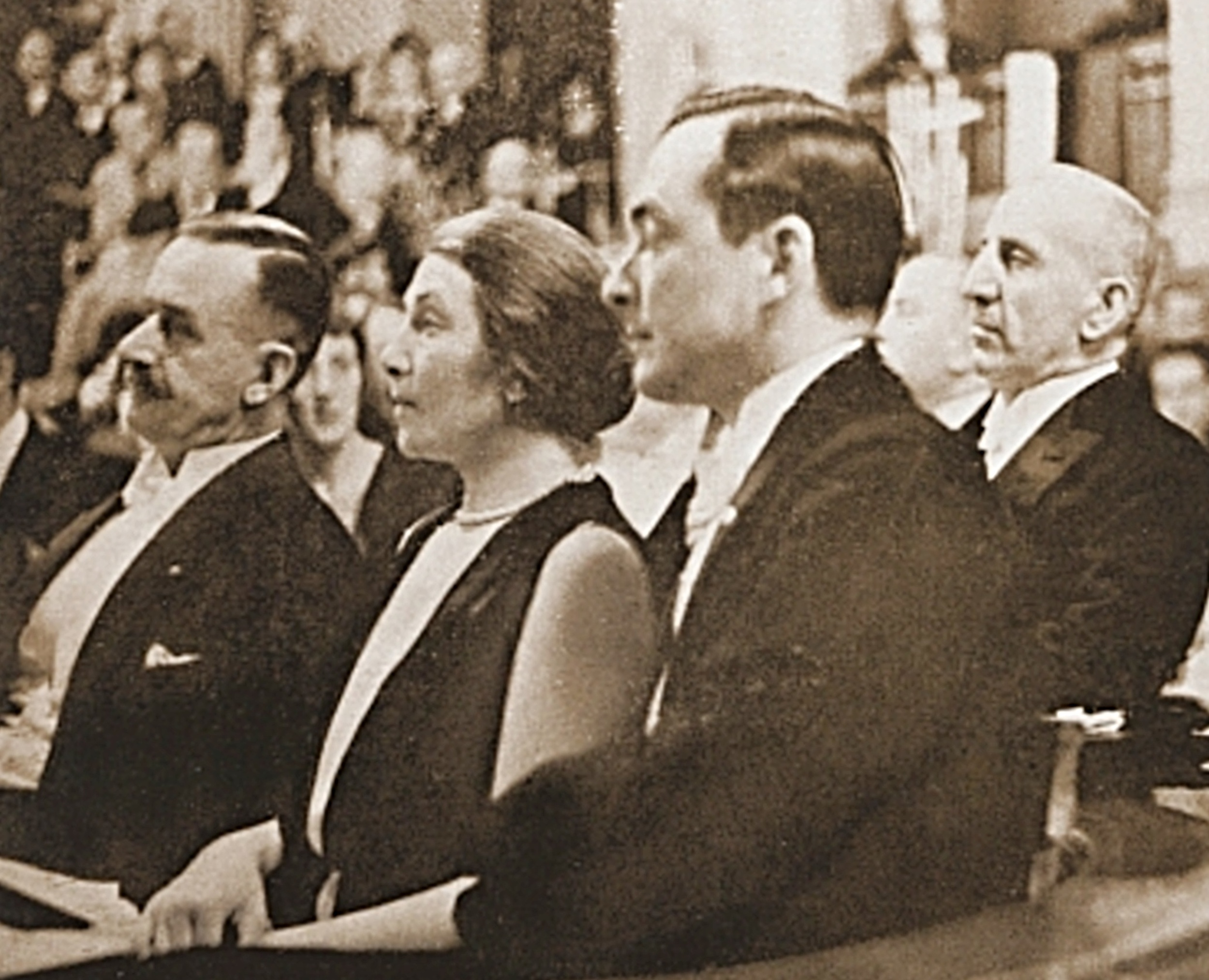
Thomas Mann, Ida Roland and her husband Richard Coudenhove-Kalergi in the second Pan-European Congress in Sing-Akademie zu Berlin on 17 May 1930

Coudenhove-Kalergi is recognized as the founder of the first popular movement for a united Europe. His intellectual influences ranged from Immanuel Kant, Rudolf Kjellén and Oswald Spengler to Arthur Schopenhauer and Friedrich Nietzsche. In politics, he was an enthusiastic supporter of the Fourteen Points made by Woodrow Wilson on 8 January 1918 and pacifist initiatives of Kurt Hiller. In December 1921, he joined the Masonic lodge "Humanitas" in Vienna. According to Stephen Dorril, in 1922, he co-founded the Pan-European Union (PEU), as "the only way of guarding against an eventual world hegemony by Russia." In 1923, he published a manifesto entitled Pan-Europa, each copy containing a membership form which invited the reader to become a member of the Pan-Europa movement. He favored social democracy as an improvement on "the feudal aristocracy of the sword" but his ambition was to create a conservative society that superseded democracy with "the social aristocracy of the spirit." European freemason lodges supported his movement, including the lodge Humanitas. Pan-Europa was translated into the languages of European countries (excluding Italian, which edition was not published at that time), the constructed language Occidental and a multitude of other languages, except for Russian.

In April 1924, Coudenhove-Kalergi founded the journal Paneuropa (1924–1938) of which he was editor and principal author. The next year he started publishing his main work, the Kampf um Paneuropa (The fight for Paneuropa, 1925–1928, three volumes). In 1926, the first Congress of the Pan-European Union was held in Vienna and the 2,000 delegates elected Coudenhove-Kalergi as president of the Central Council, a position he held until his death in 1972.

His original vision was for a world divided into only five states: a United States of Europe that would link continental countries with French and Italian possessions in Africa; a Pan-American Union encompassing North and South Americas; the British Commonwealth circling the globe; the USSR spanning Eurasia; and a Pan-Asian Union whereby Japan and China would control most of the Pacific. To him, the only hope for a Europe devastated by war was to federate along lines that the Hungarian-born Romanian Aurel Popovici and others had proposed for the dissolved multinational Empire of Austria-Hungary. According to Coudenhove-Kalergi, Pan-Europe would encompass and extend a more flexible and more competitive Austria-Hungary, with English serving as the world language, spoken by everyone in addition to their native tongue. He believed that individualism and socialism would learn to cooperate instead of compete, and urged that capitalism and communism cross-fertilise each other just as the Protestant Reformation had spurred the Catholic Church to regenerate itself.

Coudenhove-Kalergi attempted to enlist prominent European politicians in his pan-European cause. He offered the presidency of the Austrian branch of the Pan-European Union to Ignaz Seipel, who accepted the offer unhesitatingly and rewarded his beneficiary with an office in the old Imperial palace in Vienna. Coudenhove-Kalergi had less success with Tomáš Masaryk, who referred him to his uncooperative Prime Minister Edvard Beneš. However, the idea of pan-Europe elicited support from politicians as diverse as the Italian anti-Fascist politician Carlo Sforza and the German President of the Reichsbank under Hitler, Hjalmar Schacht. Although Coudenhove-Kalergi found himself unable to sway Benito Mussolini, his ideas influenced Aristide Briand through his speech in favour of a European Union in the League of Nations on 8 September 1929, as well as his famous 1930 "Memorandum on the Organisation of a Regime of European Federal Union."

Coudenhove-Kalergi proposed Beethoven's "Ode to Joy" as the Anthem of Europe in 1929, which he later proposed in 1955 as Anthem for the European Union. In 1930, he proposed a Europe Day in May and in 1932 he proposed to celebrate every 17 May, the anniversary of Aristide Briand's "Memorandum" being published in 1930.

His Pan-Europeanism earned vivid loathing from Adolf Hitler, who excoriated its pacifism and mechanical economism and belittled its founder as "a bastard." Hitler's view of Coudenhove-Kalergi was that the "rootless, cosmopolitan, and elitist half-breed" was going to repeat the historical mistakes of Coudenhove ancestors who had served the House of Habsburg. In 1928, Hitler wrote about his political opponent in his Zweites Buch, describing him as "Allerweltsbastard (commonplace bastard) Coudenhove".

Hitler argued in his 1928 Secret Book that Pan-Europeanism is unfit for the future defense of Europe against America. As America fills its North American lebensraum, "the natural activist urge that is peculiar to young nations will turn outward." But then "a pacifist-democratic Pan-European hodgepodge state" would not be able to oppose the United States, as it is "according to the conception of that commonplace bastard, Coudenhove-Kalergi..." Nazi criticism and propaganda against Coudenhove-Kalergi, and his European worldview, would decades later form the basis of the racist Kalergi plan conspiracy theory.

Nazis considered the Pan-European Union to be under the control of Freemasonry. In 1938, a Nazi propaganda book, Die Freimaurerei: Weltanschauung, Organisation und Politik (Freemasonry: Its World View, Organization and Policies), was released in German, which targeted Coudenhove-Kalergi's membership of Freemasonry, the organization suppressed by Nazis. Coudenhove-Kalergi had already left the Viennese Masonic Lodge in 1926 to avoid the criticism that occurred at that time of the relationship between the Pan-European movement and Freemasonry.

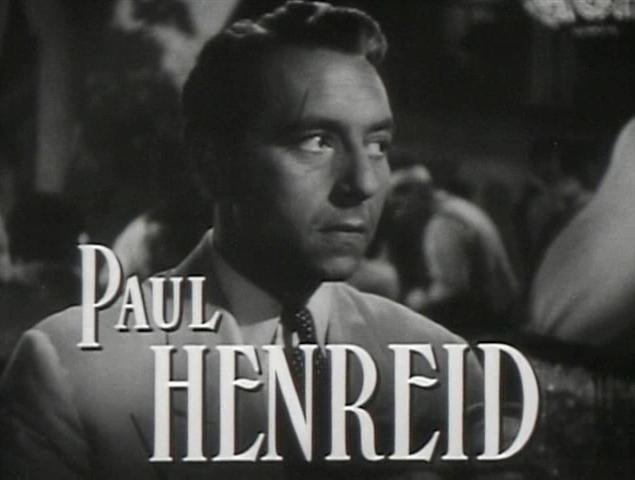
Paul Henreid as Victor Laszlo in the cinematic trailer of Casablanca

After the annexation of Austria by Nazi Germany in 1938, Coudenhove-Kalergi fled to Czechoslovakia, and thence to France. As France fell to Germany in 1940, he escaped to the United States by way of Switzerland and Portugal. When he passed a few days after the successful escape to the United States, he listened to the radio announcing the possibility that he had died. During World War II, he continued his call for the unification of Europe along the Paris-London axis. His wartime politics and adventures served as the real life basis for fictional Resistance hero Victor Laszlo, the Paul Henreid character in Casablanca.

Coudenhove-Kalergi published his work Crusade for Paneurope in 1944. His appeal for the unification of Europe enjoyed some support from Winston Churchill, Allen Dulles, and "Wild Bill" Donovan. After the announcement of the Atlantic Charter on 14 August 1941, he composed a memorandum entitled "Austria's Independence in the light of the Atlantic Charter" and sent it to Winston Churchill and Franklin Delano Roosevelt. In his position statement, Coudenhove-Kalergi took up the goals of the charter and recommended himself as head of government in exile. Both Churchill and Roosevelt distanced themselves from this document. From 1942 until his return to France in 1945, he taught at the New York University, which appointed him professor of history in 1944. At the same university Professor Ludwig von Mises studied currency problems for Coudenhove-Kalergi's movement.

On 22 July 1943, Nazis deprived him of his Doctor of Philosophy degree from the University of Vienna, with the racist argument, that as a "Jew" he was not considered worthy of an academic degree from a German university ("eines akademischen Grades einer deutschen Hochschule unwürdig") – even though he was not Jewish nor was his family Jewish. His doctorate degree was only regranted on 15 May 1955, six years after the founding of the Federal Republic of Germany and thus ten years after the end of Nazism.

The end of the World War II inaugurated a revival of pan-European hopes. In the winter of 1945, Harry S. Truman read an article in the December issue of Collier's magazine that Coudenhove-Kalergi posted about the integration of Europe. His article impressed Truman, and it was adopted to the United States' official policy. Winston Churchill's celebrated speech of 19 September 1946 to the Academic Youth in Zurich commended "the exertions of the Pan-European Union which owes so much to Count Coudenhove-Kalergi and which commanded the services of the famous French patriot and statesman Aristide Briand." In November 1946 and the spring of 1947, Coudenhove-Kalergi circulated an enquiry addressed to members of European parliaments. This enquiry resulted in the founding of the European Parliamentary Union (EPU), a nominally private organization that held its preliminary conference on 4–5 July at Gstaad, Switzerland, and followed it with its first full conference from 8 to 12 September. Speaking at the first EPU conference, Coudenhove-Kalergi argued that the constitution of a wide market with a stable currency was the vehicle for Europe to reconstruct its potential and take the place it deserves within the concert of Nations. On less guarded occasions he was heard to advocate a revival of Charlemagne's empire. In 1950 he received the first annual Karlspreis (Charlemagne Award), given by the German city of Aachen to people who contributed to the European idea and European peace. In Japan, a politician Ichirō Hatoyama was influenced by Coudenhove-Kalergi's fraternity in his book The Totalitarian State Against Man. It was translated into Japanese by Hatoyama and published in 1952. Coudenhove-Kalergi was appointed the honorary chairman of the fraternal youth association that Hatoyama, with the influence of his book, had established in 1953.

In 1955, he proposed the Beethoven's "Ode to Joy" as the music for the European Anthem, a suggestion that the Council of Europe took up 16 years later.

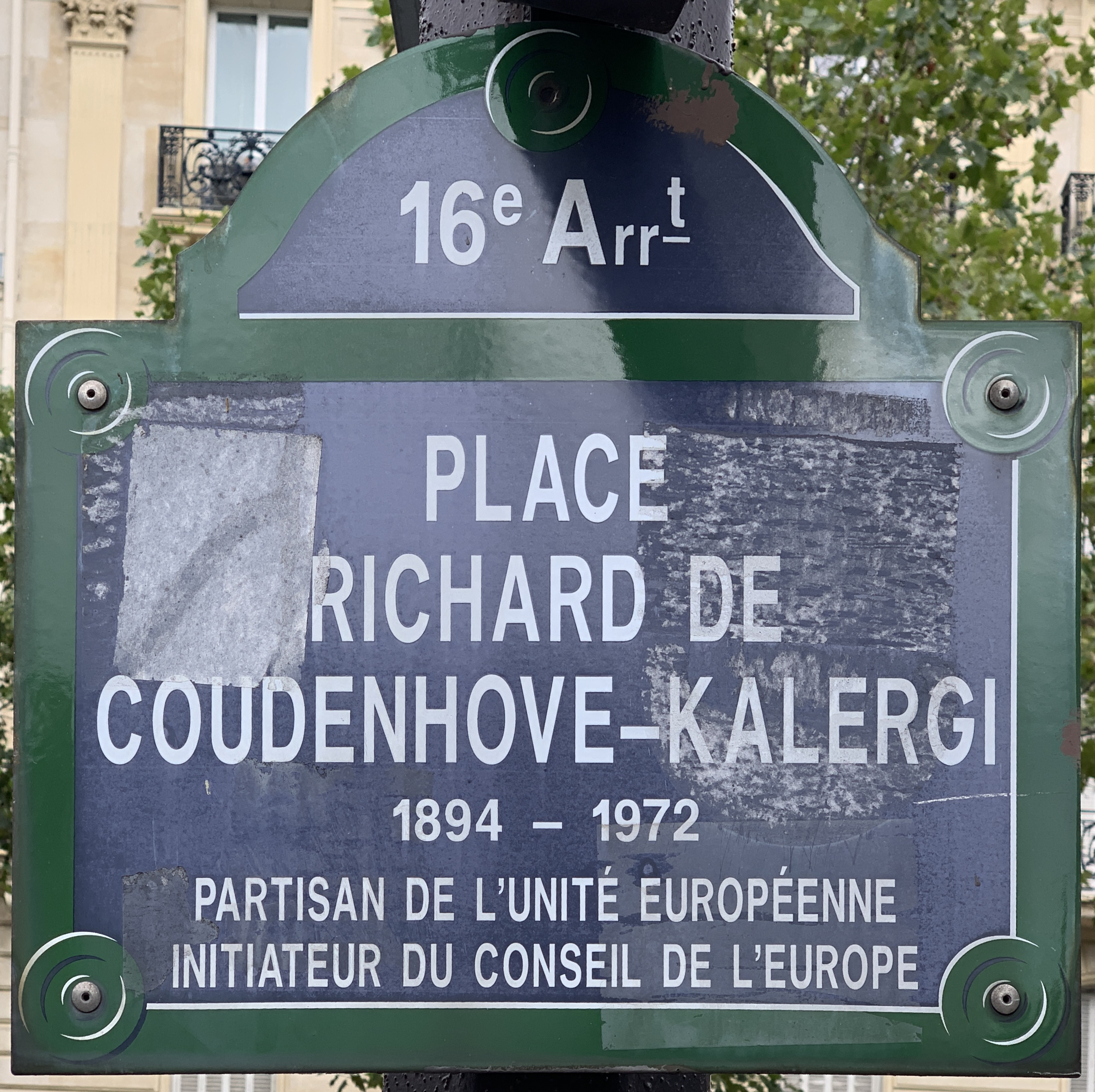
Plaque at Place Richard de Coudenhove-Kalergi in Paris

In the 1960s, Coudenhove-Kalergi urged Austria to pursue "an active policy of peace", as a "fight against the Cold War and its continuation, the atomic war". He advocated Austrian involvement in world politics in order to keep the peace, as "active neutrality". He continued his advocacy of European unification in memoranda circulated to the governments of the Federal Republic of Germany, France, the United Kingdom, and Italy. He recommended negotiations between the European Community and the European Free Trade Association towards forming a "European customs union" that would be free of political and military connections, but would eventually adopt a monetary union.

== Views on race and religion ==
In his 1925 book Practical Idealism, Coudenhove-Kalergi theorized that the historical development causing the death of European hereditary social classes would lead to an all-encompassing race of the future made up of "Eurasian-Negroid[s]", which would replace "the diversity of peoples" and "[t]oday's races and classes" with a "diversity of individuals".

In an interview in the first Pan-European Congress in 1926, he expressed the support of Jews by the pan-European movement and the benefits to Jews with the elimination of racial hatred and economic rivalry brought by the United States of Europe.

In 1932, Coudenhove-Kalergi composed, and had his publishing house reissue, a preface for a new edition of his father Heinrich von Coudenhove-Kalergi's condemnation of antisemitism in his later life. In 1933, he responded to the ascendance of Nazism by collaborating with Heinrich Mann, Arthur Holitscher, Lion Feuchtwanger, and Max Brod in writing and publishing the pamphlet Gegen die Phrase vom jüdischen Schädling ("Against the Phrase 'Jewish Parasite'").

== Journeys to Japan ==
=== Return to Japan ===
The Pan-European idea influenced a young Japanese diplomat – in the future, the president of Kajima Corporation – Morinosuke Kajima during his residence in Berlin in 1922. Coudenhove-Kalergi formed a friendship with Kajima and then asked him to translate the book Pan-Europa into Japanese. He proposed Pan-Asia to Kajima and promised to give Dutch East Indies as their friendship after the realization of the task to establish Pan-Asia. Kajima published Pan-Europa in Japanese in 1927. In 1930 Kajima retired from the Ministry of Foreign Affairs to become MP. His ambition to become an MP was due to Coudenhove-Kalergi's influence. In 1970–1971 he published the complete works of Coudenhove-Kalergi from Kajima Institute Publishing that was established by Morinosuke Kajima. He respected Coudenhove-Kalergi over a lifetime, dreaming of the realization of Pan-Asia.

In Japan, the Pan-European idea also influenced a journalist Yoshinori Maeda, the president of NHK. He became a pioneer of Asia-Pacific Broadcasting Union with the image of Pan-Europa that he read in his student days.

In 1953 Ichirō Hatoyama established Yuai Youth Association (later Yuai Association), the fraternal association as the successor of fraternity that Coudenhove-Kalergi mentioned in The Totalitarian State Against Man. The Japanese word yūai (友愛) has several meanings but especially the word used by Hatoyama means fraternity and in German brüderlichkeit. It can also be considered equivalent to "Liberty, Equality, Fraternity" (Brotherhood), the motto of the French Republic. An educator Kaoru Hatoyama became the second president of the association after her husband Ichirō, the first president, died in 1959.

In 1967 Coudenhove-Kalergi was awarded the Kajima Peace Award, and was invited to Japan by Morinosuke Kajima as the president of Kajima Institute of International Peace, Yoshinori Maeda as the president of NHK, and Kaoru Hatoyama as the president of Yuai Youth Association. Together with his second wife Alexandra in a wheelchair, Coudenhove-Kalergi stayed in Japan from 26 October to 8 November. He was also accompanied by his young brother Gerolf's daughter Barbara. Richard Coudenhove-Kalergi was also awarded First Order of the Sacred Treasure of Japan. He was granted an audience with the Emperor Hirohito, Empress Kōjun, their son Crown Prince Akihito to whom he had presented his book in 1953 in Switzerland, and Crown Princess Michiko. This time, he had returned to Japan for the first time since his childhood 71 years earlier. He gave several lectures and met various leaders. Coudenhove-Kalergi spent 2 weeks in Japan as a guest of Japanese TV, radio, newspaper, magazines and other media. While in Japan, Coudenhove-Kalergi specifically asked for a meeting with the president of Soka Gakkai, Daisaku Ikeda, as Coudenhove-Kalergi had been interested in Ikeda's work for many years.

== Death ==
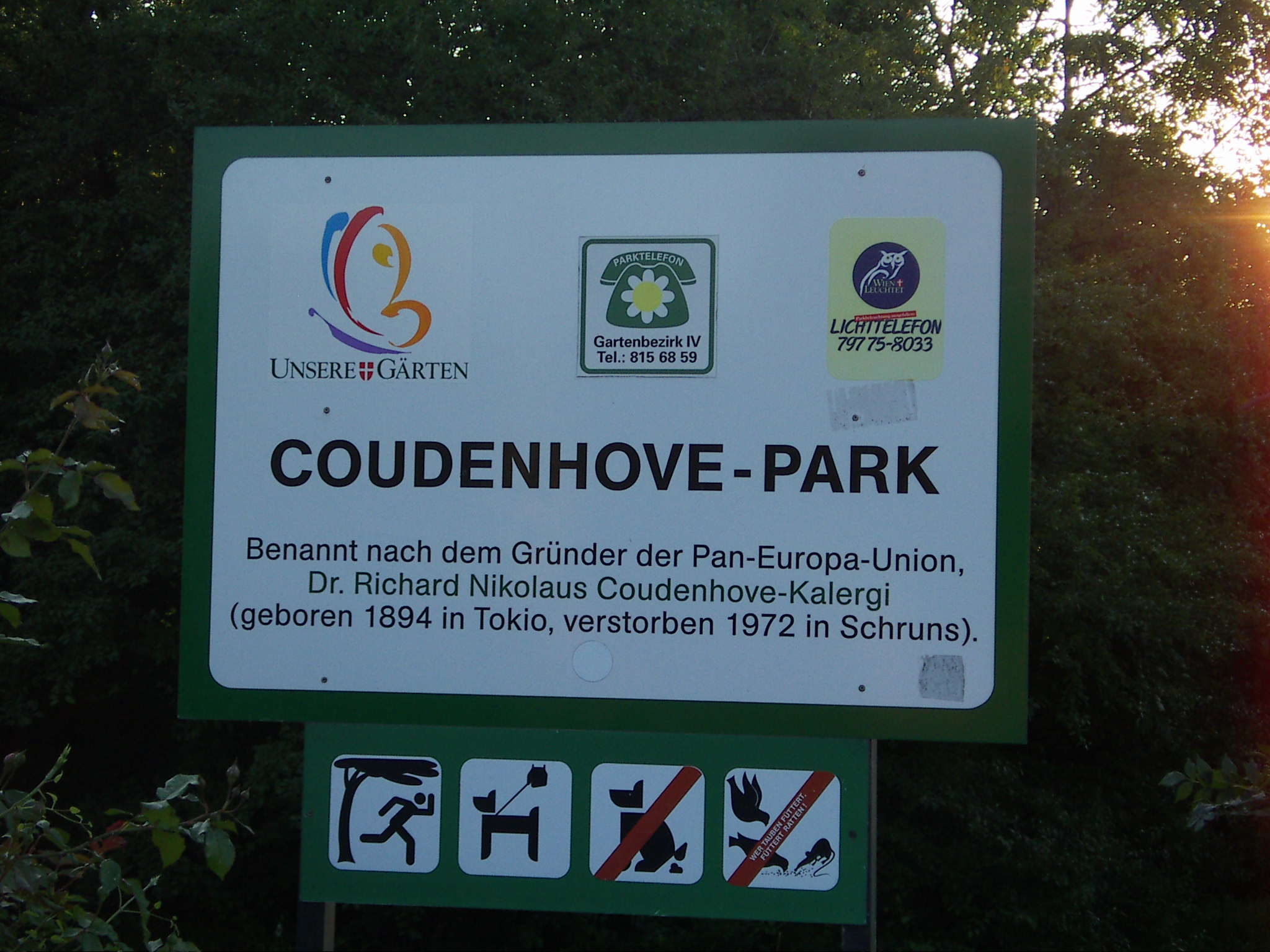
Coudenhove-Park in Hietzing, Vienna

According to a masonic report, Coudenhove-Kalergi died of a stroke. His secretary, however, indicated that Coudenhove-Kalergi possibly committed suicide. In the memoir his secretary wrote, she said his death had been kept secret so as not to disappoint those who considered him to be the great visionary of European integration. Coudenhove-Kalergi was the head of the Pan-European Union until his death. Otto von Habsburg succeeded him as president.

Coudenhove-Kalergi is buried at Gruben near Gstaad. His grave, covered with wild grapes, is located in a Japanese rock garden in the Swiss Alps. Upon the grave is the French epitaph "Pionnier des États-Unis d'Europe" (Pioneer of the United States of Europe).

Coudenhove-Kalergi was married three times: to Ida Roland (1881–1951), to Alexandra Gräfin von Tiele-Winckler (1896–1968), and to Melanie Benatzky-Hoffmann (1909–1983). His known children were Ida's daughter Erika and Alexandra's son Alexander, both of whom were his step-children.

== Publications ==
- Objektivität als Grundprinzip der Moral. Phil.diss. (1917)
- Apologie der Technik (1922)
- Adel (1922)
- Ethik und Hyperethik (1922); Héros ou Saint (1929), the Cahiers Internationaux series of the publisher Les Editions Rieder, 7, Place Saint-Sulpice, Paris, translated from German into French by Marcel Beaufils
- Pan-Europa (1923), Paneuropa Verlag; Pan-Europe (1926), Knopf, abridged, with an introduction by Nicholas Murray Butler
- Krise der Weltanschauung (1923)
- Pazifismus (1924)
- Deutschlands Europäische Sendung. Ein Gespräch (1924)
- Praktischer Idealismus: Adel, Technik, Pazifismus (1925). English translation.
- Kampf um Paneuropa (3 Volumes, 1925–28)
- Held oder Heiliger (1927)
- Was will Paneuropa? (1929)
- Brüning – Hitler: Revision der Bündnispolitik (1931), Paneuropa-Verlag
- Stalin & Co. (1931)
- Gebote des Lebens (German/Japanese dual-language edition) (1931)
- Los vom Materialismus! (1931)
- La lutte pour l'Europe (1931)
- Los vom Materialismus (1931)
- Revolution durch Technik (1932)
- Das Paneuropa ABC (1932)
- Gegen die Phrase vom jüdischen Schädling (1933), co-authored with Heinrich Mann, Arthur Holitscher, Lion Feuchtwanger, and Max Brod
- Europa erwacht! (1934)
- Judenhaß von heute: Graf H. Coudenhofe-Kalergi. Das Wesen des Antisemitismus (1935)
- Paneuropa kämpft für Friede, Arbeit, Brot! (1935)
- Europa ohne Elend: Ausgewählte Reden (1936)
- Zusammenschluss oder Zusammenbruch! (1936)
- Judenhaß! (1937)
- Totaler Staat – Totaler Mensch (1937), Paneuropa Verlag; The Totalitarian State Against Man, with an introduction by Wickham Steed, translated by Sir Andrew Mc Fadyean (1938), London, Frederick Muller Ltd.
- Europe Must Unite, translated by Sir Andrew Mc Fadyean (1939)
- Kommen die Vereinigten Staaten von Europa? (1938) Translated by Andre McFadyean as "Europe Must Unite" (1939)
- Die europäische Mission der Frau (1940)
- Crusade for Pan-Europe (1943)
- Europe Seeks Unity (introduction by William Bullitt) (1948)
- Kampf um Europa (1949)
- Ida Roland: In Memoriam (1951)
- Die Europäische Nation (1953)
- Der Gentleman (1953)
- Mutterland Europa (1953)
- An Idea Conquers the World, with a preface by Winston S. Churchill (1953)
- Vom Ewigen Krieg zum Großen Frieden (1956) Translated by Constantine Fitzgibbon as "From War to Peace" (1959)
- Eine Idee erobert Europa (1958)
- Die europäische Mission der Frau (1962)
- Die Wiedervereinigung Europas (1964)
- Totaler Mensch – Totaler Staat (1965)
- Ein Leben für Europa (1966)
- Paneuropa, 1922–1966 (1966)
- Für die Revolution der Brüderlichkeit (1968), Zurich, Verlag Die Waage
- Bi no Kuni – Nihon heno Kikyou (美の国 – 日本への帰郷), translated into Japanese by Morinosuke Kajima (1968), Tokyo, Kajima Institute Publishing
- Weltmacht Europa (1971)
- Bunmei – Nishi to Higashi (文明 – 西と東), interview collection with Daisaku Ikeda (1972), Tokyo, publication branch of Sankei Shimbun Co., Ltd.

== Awards and honors ==
- 1950: Charlemagne Prize
- 1954: Officer of the Legion of Honour
- 1962: Grand Decoration of Honour in Silver with Star of the Republic of Austria
- 1965: Sonning Prize
- 1966: Europäischer Karlspreis der Sudetendeutschen Landsmannschaft
- 1967: Order of the Sacred Treasure, 1st class of Japan
- 1967: Kajima Peace Award
- 1972: Konrad Adenauer Prize
- 1972: Knight Commander's Cross of the Federal Republic of Germany
- Dr. h. c. of Nihon University
- Ehrenbürgerwürde der Universität Frankfurt a. M.
- Nobel Peace Prize nominee in 59 nominations, known by 1971 so far. 1972 is still concealed.

== See also ==
- Federal Europe
- Ideas of European unity before 1945
- Pan-European nationalism
- Founding fathers of the European Union

== Sources ==
- Tozawa, Hidenori (2013a). ミツコ・クーデンホーフ・カレルギー (青山光子) (in Japanese). Richard Coudenhove-Kalergi Forum (School of Law, Tohoku University).
- Tozawa, Hidenori (2013b). リヒャルト・クーデンホーフ・カレルギー (in Japanese). Richard Coudenhove-Kalergi Forum (School of Law, Tohoku University).
- Tozawa, Hidenori (2013c). クーデンホーフ・カレルギーと鹿島守之助 (in Japanese). Richard Coudenhove-Kalergi Forum (School of Law, Tohoku University).
- Tozawa, Hidenori (2013d). クーデンホーフ・カレルギーと創価学会 (in Japanese). Richard Coudenhove-Kalergi Forum (School of Law, Tohoku University).
- 第3話 鹿島平和賞授賞の舞台. Kajima MONTHLY REPORT DIGEST (in Japanese). Kajima Corporation. April 2005.
- Hirakawa, Hitoshi (2011). "English Edition: Dr. Morinosuke Kajima and Pan-Asianism" (PDF). SGRA Report No. 58. Atsumi International Scholarship Foundation (AISF) / Sekiguchi Global Research Association (SGRA). pp. 37–77. Archived from the original (PDF) on 29 November 2014.
- Persson, Hans-Åke; Stråth, Bo (2007). Reflections on Europe: Defining a Political Order in Time and Space. Europe plurielle / Multiple Europes. Vol. 37. Bruxelles, Bern, Berlin, Frankfurt am Main, New York, Oxford, Wien: Peter Lang. ISBN 9789052010656.
- Chambers, Whittaker (January 1944), Historian and History Maker, The American Mercury, ISBN 9781412824590
- Gehler, Michael. "A Visionary proved Himself to be a Realist: Richard N. Coudenhove-Kalergi, Austria, and the "United States of Europe", 1923–2003" (PDF). Europe on its Way to Unity. From Richard Coudenhove-Kalergi's Pan-European Vision to the Treaty of Athens. Tokai University Human Security review [2004/2005], No. 9. pp. 171–186. Archived from the original (PDF) on 30 September 2011.
- Jilek, Lubor. "Pan-Europe de Coudenhove-Kalergi: l'homme, le projet et le mouvement paneuropéen" (PDF) (in French). Tokai University Human Security review [2004/2005], No. 9. pp. 205–209. Archived from the original (PDF) on 30 September 2011.
- Dorril, Stephen (2000), MI6: Inside the Covert World of Her Majesty's Secret Intelligence Service, Free Press, OCLC 607416701
- Rosamond, Ben (2000), Theories of European Integration, Palgrave Macmillan, OCLC 442641648
- Hewitson, Mark; D'Auria, Matthew, eds. (2012), Europe in Crisis: Intellectuals and the European Idea, 1917–1957, Berghahn Books, ISBN 9780857457288
- Ziegerhofer, Anita (2004). Botschafter Europas: Richard Nikolaus Coudenhove-Kalergi und die Paneuropa-Bewegung in den zwanziger und dreissiger Jahren (in German). Wien: Böhlau Verlag. ISBN 9783205772170.
- Lipgens, Walter, ed. (1984), Documents on the History of European Integration, Volume 1: Continental Plans for European Union 1939–1945, Walter de Gruyter, OCLC 406352658
- Lipgens, Walter; Loth, Wilfried, eds. (1988), Documents on the History of European Integration, Volume 3: The Struggle for European Union by Political Parties and Pressure Groups in Western European Countries 1945–1950, Walter de Gruyter, ISBN 9783110114294
- Johnston, William M. (1983), The Austrian Mind: An Intellectual and Social History, 1848–1938, University of California Press, ISBN 9780520049550
- Weigall, David; Stirk, Peter M. R., eds. (1992), The Origins and Development of the European Community, Leicester: Leicester University Press, ISBN 9780718514280
- Guieu, Jean-Michel; Le Dréau, Christophe (2009). Le " Congrès de l'Europe " à La Haye (1948–2008). Euroclio series (in French). Vol. 49. Bruxelles, Bern, Berlin, Frankfurt am Main, New York, Oxford, Wien: Peter Lang. ISBN 9789052015736.
- Burleigh, Michael (2001), The Third Reich: A New History, Hill and Wang, OCLC 44084002
- Mazower, Mark (2013), Hitler's Empire: Nazi Rule in Occupied Europe, Penguin UK, ISBN 9780141917504
- Schwarz, Dieter (1938). Die Freimaurerei: Weltanschauung, Organisation und Politik. Berlin: Franz Eher Nachfolger GmbH. (with an introduction by Reinhard Heydrich)
- Denslow, William R. (1957). 10,000 Famous Freemasons. Richmond, Virginia: Macoy Publishing & Masonic Supply Co., Inc. (with an introduction by Harry S. Truman)
- Jajeśniak-Quast, Dagmara (2010), "Polish Economic Circles and the Question of the Common European Market after World War I", Einzelveröffentlichungen des Deutschen Historischen Instituts Warschau Bd. 23, Fibre-Verlag, ISBN 9783938400586
- Levy, Jonathan (2007). The Intermarium: Wilson, Madison, and East Central European Federalismahren. Universal-Publishers. ISBN 9781581123692. The role of Count Coudenhove-Kalergi in east central European federalism is reexamined.
- Churchill, Winston S. (2003), Never Give In!: The Best of Winston Churchill's Speeches, Hyperion, ISBN 9781401300562
- Langmuir, Gavin I. (8 May 1990), History, Religion, and Antisemitism, University of California Press, ISBN 9780520912267
- Robertson, Ritchie (1999), The "Jewish Question" in German Literature, 1749–1939: Emancipation and Its Discontents, Oxford University Press, ISBN 9780198186311
- Botz-Bornstein, Thorsten (2007), European Transfigurations—Eurafrica and Eurasia: Coudenhove and Trubetzkoy Revisited, European Legacy, ISSN 1084-8770
- Pempel, T.J.; Lee, Chung-Min (2012), Security Cooperation in Northeast Asia: Architecture and Beyond, Routledge, ISBN 9781136309847
- Zuber, Otto (1995). "RICHARD NIKOLAUS Graf COUDENHOVE-KALERGI als Freimaurer". Jahrbuch der Forschungsloge Quatuor Coronati (in German). Vol. 32. Bayreuth: Forschungsloge Quatuor Coronati.
- Pernhorst, Christian (2008). Das paneuropäische Verfassungsmodell des Grafen Richard N. Coudenhove-Kalergi (in German). Nomos Verlag. ISBN 9783832932022.
- Kosch, Wilhelm, ed. (2003). Deutsches Literatur-Lexikon. das 20. Jahrhundert Band 5: Butenschön – Dedo (in German). Walter de Gruyter. ISBN 9783110961119.
- Duchhardt, Heinz (2005). Option Europa: deutsche, polnische und ungarische Europapläne des 19. und 20. Jahrhunderts Band 2 (in German). Vandenhoeck & Ruprecht. ISBN 9783525362877.
- Coudenhove-Kalergi, Richard Nikolaus (1925). Praktischer Idealismus [Practical Idealism] (in German). Wien-Leipzig: Pan-Europa-Verlag. UBR069031840355.
- Coudenhove-Kalergi, Richard Nikolaus (1953). An Idea Conquers the World. London: Hutchinson. (New York: Roy Publishers)

Richard Nikolaus Eijiro Graf von Coudenhove-Kalergi House of Coudenhove-Kalergi Born: 16 November 1894 Died: 27 July 1972
New creation	International President of the Paneuropean Union; 1926–1972	Succeeded by Otto von Habsburg (elected in 1973)
