= Ida Roland =

Austrian actress (1881–1951)

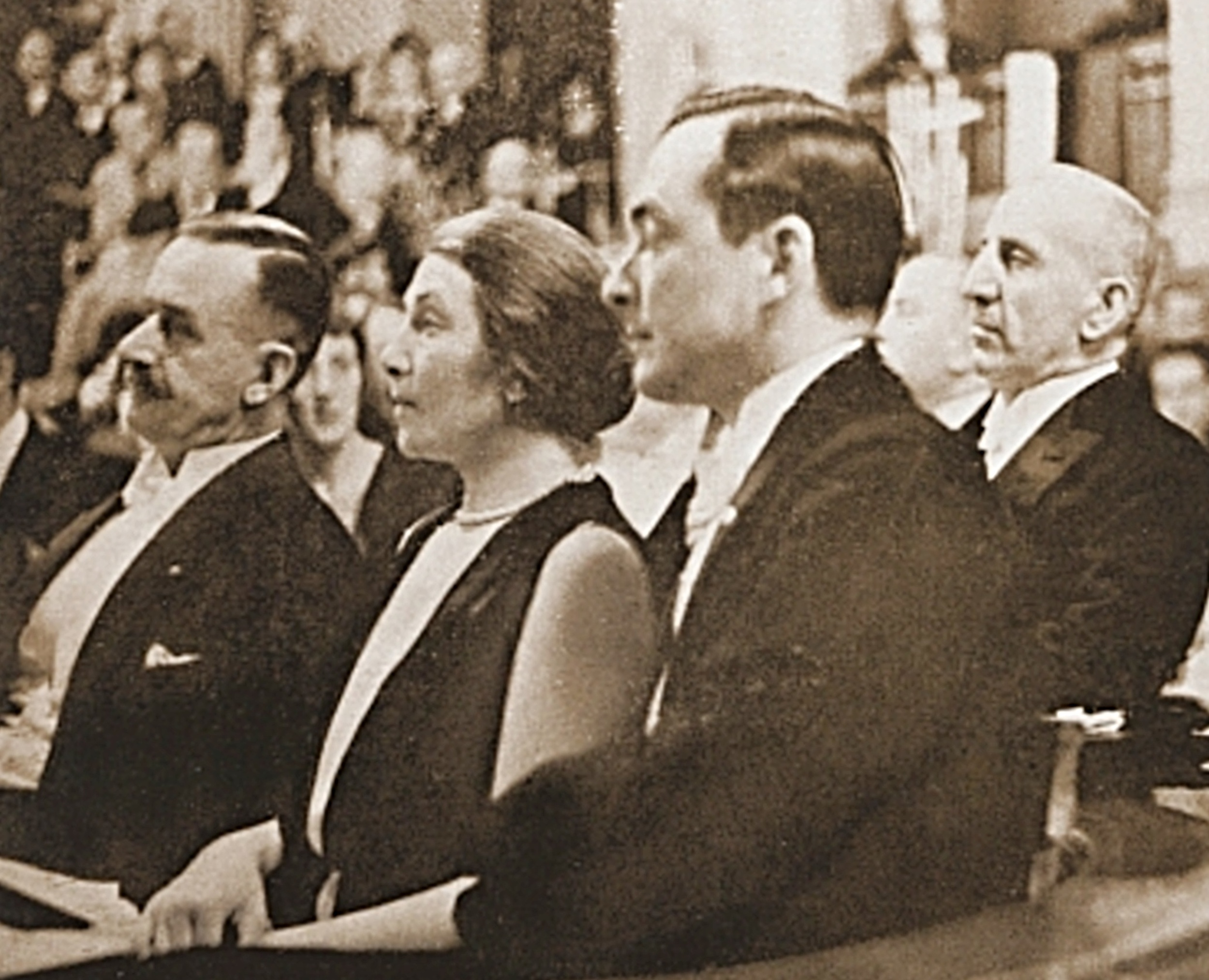
Ida Roland with Thomas Mann and her husband Richard Coudenhove-Kalergi at the second Pan-European Congress in Sing-Akademie zu Berlin on May 17, 1930.

Ida Roland (18 February 1881 in Vienna, Austria – 27 March 1951 in Nyon, Switzerland), born Ida Klausner, was a Jewish Austrian and German actress.

Her acting career began at the city theatre in Innsbruck. From 1924 to 1927 she took part in an ensemble at the Viennese Burgtheater. Between 1927 and 1929 it arose in the Theater in der Josefstadt, returning to the Burgtheater between 1935 and 1937. Roland was Jewish. She fled from Austria in 1938 and lived from 1940 to 1945 in New York. Later she resided in Switzerland.

She was the first wife of Richard von Coudenhove-Kalergi, who served as the founding president of the Paneuropean Union.
