= Barbara Coudenhove-Kalergi =

Austrian journalist (born 1932)

- Coudenhove-Kalergi in 2025
- Born: 15 January 1932 (age 94); Prague
- Occupation: Journalist
- Writing career
- Notable awards: Order of Tomáš Garrigue Masaryk, Class IV (2001)

Barbara Coudenhove-Kalergi (born 15 January 1932, Prague) is an Austrian journalist.

== Biography ==
A member of the Coudenhove-Kalergi family, she is the daughter of Gerolf von Coudenhove-Kalergi and thus the niece of Richard von Coudenhove-Kalergi and of Ida Friederike Görres (née von Coudenhove-Kalergi) As ethnic German she was expelled from her hometown Prague during the post-war expulsion of Germans from Czechoslovakia. She was awarded the Order of Tomáš Garrigue Masaryk, Class IV, in 2001. After the fall of the communist dictatorships, she returned to the country of her birth. From 1991 to 1995, she worked as an ORF correspondent in Prague. Today she writes as a freelance journalist mainly for Czech and Austrian newspapers and is the editor of several books with texts on the history and present of the countries of the former Eastern Bloc. Since 2005 she has been a member of the editorial board of the journal Datum.

She was married to Franz Marek.
