= Tilly Spiegel =

Austrian activist

Ottilie "Tilly" Spiegel (10 December 1906 - 1988) was an Austrian political activist, first as a member of the Communist Party and then as part of the wartime resistance. After her actions had earned her a term of imprisonment during the Austrofascist period she fled the country, ending up as in Paris as a member of the French Resistance. Her parents were murdered by the Nazis but five siblings managed to emigrate to England or to the United States. In 1945 the merger combining Germany and Austria was reversed at the insistence of the occupying powers whose military victory had put an end to the Hitler regime. Tilly Spiegel returned to Vienna (where she had spent her student years) and was one of the first researchers to study the histories of victims of National Socialism. Books that she published were frequently consulted and quoted by subsequent researchers.

== Biography ==
=== Family provenance ===
Ottilie Spiegel was born in Novoselica near Chernivtsi in Bukovina, which at that time was a multi-cultural frontier region of the Austro-Hungarian empire. Across the border to the east of Chernivtsi lay the Russian Empire. Ottilie was the eldest of her parents' six recorded children. Karl Spiegel (1880-1941), the children's father, was a businessman. In 1941 both Tilly Spiegel's parents were killed by the authorities in the Izbica "transit-ghetto", created that year in part of a village in the countryside east of Warsaw and Lublin.

=== Early years ===
While she was young the family evidently moved to Vienna, which is where Spiegel attended school. Between 1925 and 1933 she worked at a succession of mostly clerical jobs in the city. At one stage during her time in Vienna she was employed as a gymnastics teacher. Between 1927 and 1930 she also held, in parallel, functions within the Young Communists and was a trades union member. She joined The Party in 1930 after which she combined party duties with her non-political work. By 1933, which is when the party was banned by emergency degree as the country transitioned to post-democratic government, she was working for the party leadership team for the Vienna city and the surrounding region. Subsequently, she continued to work "underground" (illegally) for the party, serving between 1933 and February 1935, and taking on the party leadership role for "District 4" (Kreis IV).

=== Arrest and emigration ===
Her political activity led to her arrest in February 1935, and in November 1935 she was sentenced to a 18-month prison term. In March 1936 the sentence was reduced to 14 months. In Autumn 1937, still at liberty, Tilly Spiegel emigrated to Switzerland. Here she organised frontier crossing documentation for Austrian Communists transferring via Switzerland to Spain to fight with the International Brigades in the civil war which had been triggered in July 1936 when a group of Spanish generals had staged an attempt to overthrow the increasingly unstable government. Her activity was evidently illegal, and the Swiss authorities arrested Spiegel near the Austrian frontier at Rorschach in May 1937. She was detained and sentenced in nearby St. Gallen and then, in May 1938, expelled from the country. Instead of returning home to Vienna she now crossed the frontier (illegally) into France, settling in Paris where, until the outbreak of war, she supported herself as a gymnastics teacher.

=== Paris ===
In November 1938 she teamed up with Marie Pappenheim to establish the "Cercle Culturel Autrichien" (loosely, "Austrian cultural circle"). The "circle" involved itself in support for refugees and women identified, after war was declared, as enemy aliens and interned in Paris. It was financed from Spiegel's earnings as a gymnastics teacher.

On 3 September 1939 France and Britain declared war on Nazi Germany: on the streets of Paris and London eerily little changed, as the governments in those cities waited to see what Chancellor Hitler would do next. The answer arrived on 10 May 1940 when the German army invaded and quickly overran the northern half of France, taking over in Paris during the second week of June. From the end of 1940 or early 1941, Tilly Spiegel was actively engaged in resistance work for Travail Allemand (TA), an anti-fascist organisation of German expatriates that increasingly operated as a section of the French Resistance.Most were communists, many had fled Nazi Germany to escape life-threatening political and/or race-based persecution. A lot of TA members had fought in the Spanish Civil War, and ended up in France after the Falangist victory. One returnee from the Spanish Civil War who ended up as a TA resistance leader was Franz Marek, a leading Austrian communist intellectual originally from Galicia. It was probably through the TA that Tilly Spiegel met Franz Marek. At some stage they married: much later, in 1974, that marriage ended in divorce.

=== Resistance ===
Between 1941 and 1943 Tilly was based in Nancy as a "regional TA instructor" for Meurthe-et-Moselle. Later she transferred to Lille to undertake similar duties in respect of the Nord department and Pas-de-Calais. Both these areas were in what then Germans had defined as Zone interdite, subjected to additional movement restrictions on local populations and higher levels of Gestapo and military supervision than most of occupied northern France. Sources are understandably vague about the details of Spiegel's resistance work, but there can be little doubt that as a communist resistance member easily identifiable as a non-local, her activities would placed her in extreme danger. In 1943 the focus of her activities evidently returned to Paris: it was probably in August 1944 that she was arrested by the Gestapo and detained, like her husband, in Fresnes Prison, a short distance to the south of the city. They were scheduled for execution. By the end of the month Paris had been liberated and both were released in the turmoil that accompanied the German military withdrawal.

=== After the war ===
In or before August 1945 Tilly Spiegel returned to Vienna where the Communist Party was no longer banned. Indeed, the Soviets had used their influence with the other occupying powers to ensure that there were seven communists in the new government. She rejoined the party's city leadership team (Bezirksleitung), remaining a member of it between 1945 and 1968. In addition, she quickly engaged in the work of building up what subsequently became the Documents Archive of the Austrian Resistance ("Dokumentationsarchiv des österreichischen Widerstandes" / DÖW). She worked closely with the DÖW's head of research, Herbert Steiner (1923-2001). Others involved included her former resistance comrade, Selma Steinmetz, along with Jonny Moser and Herbert Rosenkranz. During the 1960s these, Spiegel and the others were among the first researchers into Austria's National Socialist period to focus on the regime's victims. Moser investigated the persecution of Jews while Steinmetz concentrated on government treatment of the Sinti and Romani people. Spiegel worked on what had happened to women and girls engaged in antifascist resistance and Rosenkranz studied Austria's experience of the November 1938 pogrom ("Kristallnacht"). During the later 1960s, even before the crushing of the Prague Spring, Spiegel seems to have engaged in major "inner-party criticism" over the path taken by postwar communism. (Note: "Tilly Spiegel places in doubt the entire institution, and with it the Leninist conception of the [communist] party. That she thereby imperils the material and psychological security of many comrades is evident from the reaction: 'no counter-argument, only indignation, astonishment, icy rejection'" " Tilly Spiegel stellt die ganze Institution und mit ihr die Leninsche Parteikonzeption in Frage. Daß sie damit die materielle und psychische Sicherheit vieler Genossen gefährdete, zeigte die Reaktion: ‹kaum Argumente, nur Empörung, Erstaunen, eisige Ablehnung›") Little is known of her final years.

== Celebration ==
Tilly Spiegel was awarded the Golden Decoration of Honour for Services to the Republic of Austria
