= Weg und Ziel =

Marxist monthly journal in Austria (1935–2000)

- Categories: Political magazine
- Frequency: Monthly
- Publisher: Globus Verlag
- Founded: 1935
- Final issue Number: 2000; 58
- Country: Austria
- Based in: Vienna
- Language: German
- OCLC: 85340172

Weg und Ziel (German: The Road and Goal) was a monthly Marxist–Leninist theoretical journal which was affiliated with the Communist Party of Austria. The journal was published in Vienna in the period 1935–2000. Its subtitle was Monatsschrift für Theorie und Praxis des Marxismus-Leninismus (German: Monthly Journal for the Theory and Practice of Marxism-Leninism).

== History and profile ==
Weg und Ziel was launched in 1935. The journal was one of the publications of the Communist Party. It was published by the Globus Verlag, based in Vienna, on a monthly basis. Its sister publication was Volksstimme.

Shortly after its start Weg und Ziel became an illegal publication. One of the significant topics that the journal dealt with in its early years was the concept of nation in Austria. However, it mostly published the German translations of the official news published in the Soviet Union which were featured with no comment or further discussion. Weg und Ziel folded in 2000.

== Editors ==
Long-term editor of Weg und Ziel was Franz Marek who was appointed to the post in 1946. Under his editorship the journal adopted a Gramscian approach. In line with this approach it published a comprehensive interview with Palmiro Togliatti, the Italian Communist leader, in Summer 1956.

In 1992 Julius Mende was appointed editor. Some of the contributors included Ernst Fischer, Otto Langbein and Alfred Klahr.
