= Düzen Tekkal =

German journalist (born 1978)

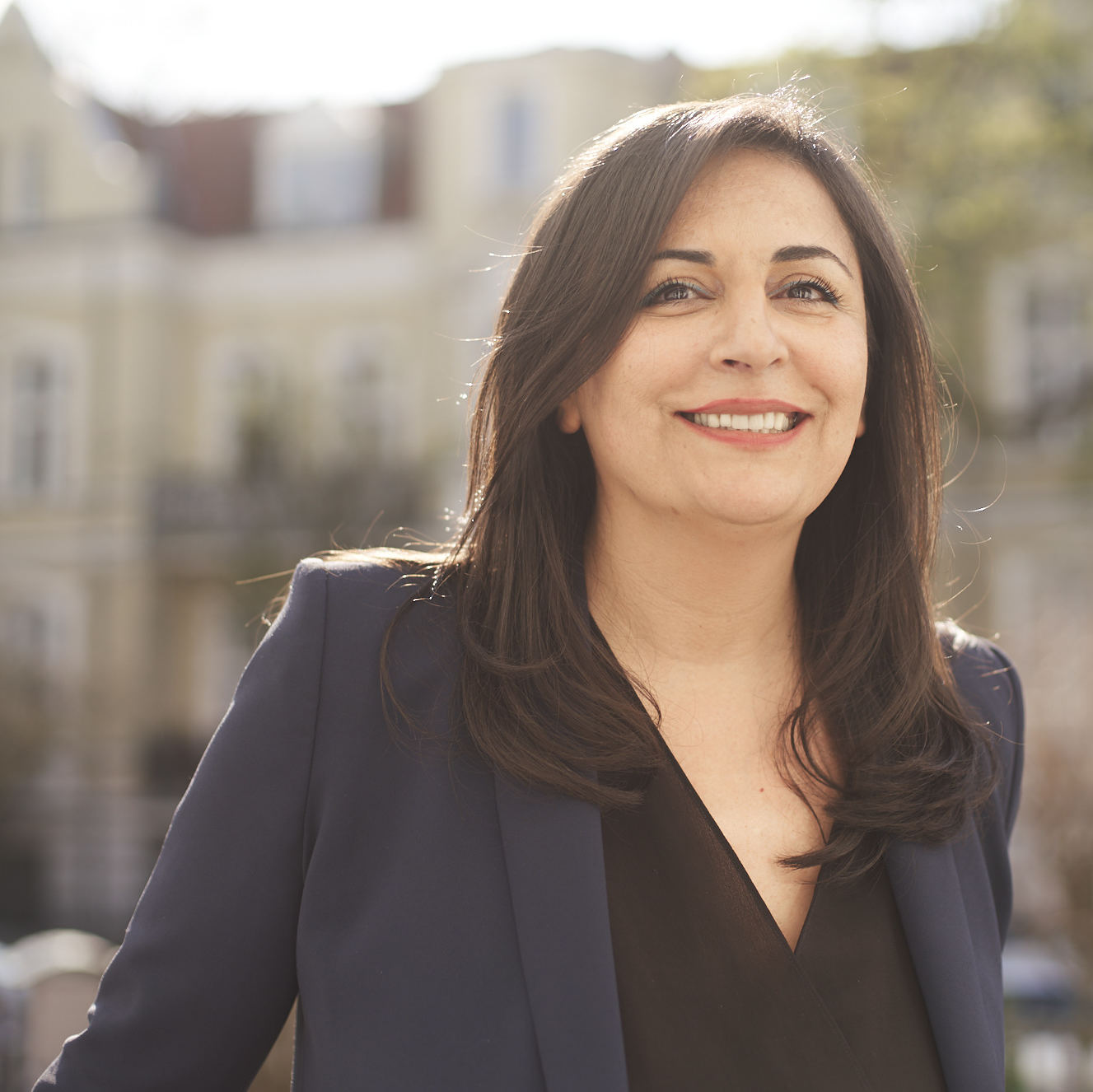
- Born: 2 September 1978 (age 48); Hanover, West Germany
- Education: University of Hanover
- Occupations: Journalist, author and documentary filmmaker/director

Düzen Tekkal (born 2 September 1978) is a German author, television journalist, filmmaker, war correspondent, political scientist, and social entrepreneur of Kurdish descent. She is a Yazidi.

== Early life and education ==
Tekkal's parents came to Germany in the 1970s as immigrants from southeastern Turkey. In their homeland, they had been persecuted as Kurds and part of the Yazidi religious community. In Germany, her father worked as a tiler and her mother was a housewife. She is one of eleven siblings.

Tekkal was born in Hanover. In 1998 she graduated from high school and in 2002 she began to study political science and German language and literature at the Leibniz University of Hanover, graduating in 2007. In her master's thesis, which she completed with honors, she wrote about Kurdish Yazidis in the diaspora and the sociopolitical conditions of their integration, as well as with integration policy in Europe.

== Career ==
=== Career in journalism ===
After her studies, Tekkal worked as an intern at the German Orient Foundation in Hamburg and began her career as a television journalist at RTL. She worked there as an editor and reporter for various formats such as Spiegel TV, stern TV and Extra – Das RTL-Magazin. In 2010, she was awarded the Bavarian Film Prize for her reportage "Angst vor den neuen Nachbarn" (Fear of the New Neighbors) together with Extra editorial director Jan Rasmus.

Since 2014, Tekkal has been working as a freelance journalist, filmmaker, war correspondent and author. She wrote two books published by Berlin Verlag, which reached number 16 and 17 on the Spiegel bestseller paperback list, and has contributed to other publications as a guest author. She mainly deals with the topics of migration, integration and identity.

To make the documentary film "Háwar – Meine Reise in den Genozid" (Háwar, a cry for help), Tekkal traveled to Iraq in 2014. The film focuses on the destruction caused by ISIS and the genocide against the Yazidis living in northern Iraq, especially the violence against women. It premiered at the 49th Hof International Film Festival in 2015. The documentary was shown in the German Bundestag, at the European Parliament and in a screening at the United Nations headquarters in New York City in 2017, as part of an event organized by the Office of the Special Representative of the Secretariat General on Sexual Violence in Conflict at the United Nations, the Permanent Mission of Germany to the UN, and the Permanent Mission of Iraq to the UN.

Tekkal's second film, "Jiyan – Die vergessenen Opfer des IS" (Jiyan – The Forgotten Victims of ISIS), premiered in January 2020 at Kino International in Berlin and was first broadcast on RBB Fernsehen in December of that year. In the documentary, Tekkal accompanies Najlaa Matto, a Yazidi woman freed from ISIS captivity, who returns to northern Iraq for the purpose of coming to terms with and prosecuting the crimes against her people. One of the central points of the film, in addition to taking stock of the destruction of lives, destinies and culture, is an appeal for human rights and a reminder of the international community's responsibility, as well as a demand that ISIS perpetrators be held accountable and brought before a criminal tribunal.

Tekkal is also active as a host, for example at the publication of the study "Taboo & Tolerance" by the German Federal Ministry of Defense. Furthermore, she hosts several podcasts, such as the series "Vergessen: Die Frauenmorde von Juárez" (Forgotten: Femicides in Ciudad Juárez) with Leyla Yenirce or the DFB Foundations podcast, "Mehr als ein Spiel" (More than a Game), where she speaks to and about people who use soccer as a means of social, societal and cultural engagement.

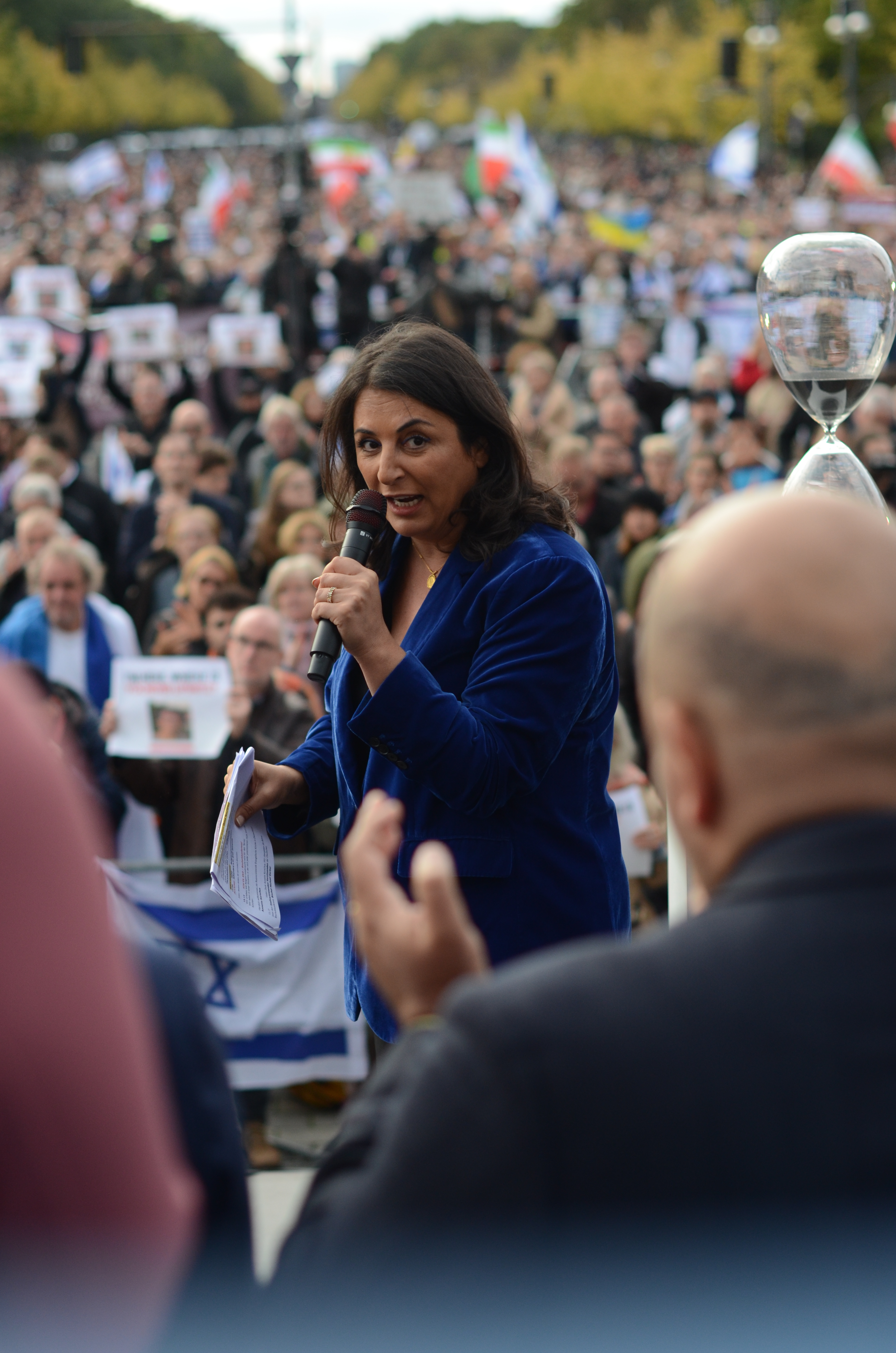
Tekkal speaking at a demonstration against antisemitism in Berlin, October 2023

=== Political career ===
In the 2016 state elections, Tekkal was part of CDU candidate Julia Klöckner's shadow cabinet in Rhineland-Palatinate. The following year, she was part of Bernd Althusmann's shadow cabinet for the Lower Saxony state elections. After the national elections the same year, she was widely considered a candidate to become the Federal Government Commissioner for Migration, Refugees and Integration in the cabinet of Chancellor Angela Merkel, but the post eventually went to Annette Widmann-Mauz.

In 2019, Tekkal was appointed by Federal Minister for Economic Cooperation and Development Gerd Müller to the Commission on the Causes of Migration, co-chaired by Bärbel Diekmann and Gerda Hasselfeldt.

In June 2021 Tekkal testified as an expert at a public hearing of the Bundestag Committee on Human Rights and Humanitarian Aid on the human rights situation in Turkey.

Tekkal's political positions include a pluralistic Germany based on the free democratic basic order, which counteracts extremism, especially Islamism and far-right politics. Furthermore, she is also in favor of a women's quota for companies.

Tekkal has been part of delegation trips with various ministers to Iraq, including with Development Minister Gerd Müller (2018), Defense Minister Annegret Kramp-Karrenbauer (2019) and Foreign Minister Annalena Baerbock (2023).

== Philanthropy ==
=== HÁWAR.help ===
Together with her sister, the former professional soccer player Tuğba Tekkal, she founded the non-profit association for humanitarian aid Háwar.help and is its chairwoman. The association runs several projects centered around women's empowerment and women's rights. The project Scoring Girls, which was initiated by her sister Tuğba, organizes soccer practice for girls from immigrant and disadvantaged families. The project's patron is journalist and TV presenter Anne Will. In 2021, Annalena Baerbock became a patron of the Back to Life project.

=== GermanDream education initiative ===
In 2019, Tekkal founded the GermanDream education initiative, which organizes dialogs about values at German schools. The aim is to teach young people the values of freedom and self-determination and to prevent extremism, particularly Islamism and right-wing extremism. In addition, Tekkal launched the hashtag #GermanDream on the social media platform Twitter, under which people with an immigrant background can share their life and success stories as an incentive for other immigrants.

== Work (selection) ==
=== Publications ===
- 2020: #GermanDream: Wie wir ein besseres Deutschland schaffen, Berlin Verlag, Berlin, ISBN 978-3827014207
- 2016: Deutschland ist bedroht: Warum wir unsere Werte jetzt verteidigen müssen, Berlin Verlag, Berlin, ISBN 9783827013286

==== As contributor ====
- 2021: Zukunftsrepublik – 80 Vorausdenker*innen springen in das Jahr 2030, Campus-Verlag, Frankfurt am Main, ISBN 9783593513867
- 2021: Väter & Töchter (Bettina Flitner), Elisabeth Sandmann Verlag, München, ISBN 9783945543832
- 2020: Toleranz – Schaffen wir das?, Asfa-Wossen Asserate/Annette Friese (Hrsg.), Adeo Verlag, Aßlar, ISBN 9783863342708
- 2019: Der politische Islam gehört nicht zu Deutschland: Wie wir unsere freie Gesellschaft verteidigen, Carsten Linnemann/Winfried Bausback (Hrsg.), Verlag Herder, Freiburg im Breisgau, ISBN 9783451383519
- 2018: Ohne Familie ist kein Staat zu machen: Zeit zum Umdenken, Karl-Heinz B. van Lier (Hrsg.), Verlag Herder, Freiburg im Breisgau, ISBN 9783451382826
- 2016: Gewalt (Flensburger Hefte – Buchreihe), ISBN 9783945916100

=== Documentaries ===
- 2020: Jiyan – Die vergessenen Opfer des IS, 90 min, Premiere on January 21, 2020, in Berlin
- 2015: Háwar – Meine Reise in den Genozid, Premiere on November 25, 2015, at the 49. Hof International Film Festival

== Awards (selection) ==
- 2026: Prize for Understanding and Tolerance
- 2024: Lower Saxony State Prize
- 2021: Cross of the Order of Merit of the Federal Republic of Germany
- 2021: Engagement-Blum-Preis
- 2021: Most Influential Woman of the Year, award by Impact of Diversity
- 2020/2021: BfDT-Botschafterin für Demokratie und Toleranz of the Bündnis für Demokratie und Toleranz
- 2020: Wilhelm Wernicke Preis of the Hertha BSC Stiftung for Scoring Girls
- 2020: Julius Hirsch Preis, award by the DFB for HÁWAR.help
- 2020: German Diversity Award in the category Ethnicity, award by BeyondGenderAgenda
- 2020: She For Social Impact Award, Culture
- 2019: Rupert-Neudeck-Medaille für Mut & Menschlichkeit
- 2019 (HAWAR.help e.V.): Europäischer CIVIS SPECIAL Medienpreis: Fußball und Integration for the video Scoring Girls
- 2018: Menschenrechtspreis of the Ingrid zu Solms-Stiftung
- 2018 (mit Renate Matthei): Aufmüpfige Frau des Jahres of the Stiftung aufmüpfige Frauen
- 2018 (mit Jan Ilhan Kizilhan): Friedens- und Integrationspreis of the Kurdischen Gemeinde Deutschlands
- 2018: Frau Europas der European Movement Germany
- 2017: (with Jan Ilhan Kizilhan): Demokratie Preis/ Ramer Award for Courage in the Defense of Democracy of the American Jewish Committee
- 2013: (with Marlene Alber, Christopher Grass und Ralf Herrmann): BNK-Medienpreis of the Bundesverband Niedergelassener Kardiologen for the Extra-show: Das Herzschlagfinale
- 2010: (with Jan Rasmus): Bayerischer Fernsehpreis for the Extra-show: Angst vor den neuen Nachbarn
