= Ruth von Mayenburg =

Austrian journalist, writer and translator

- Born: 1 July 1907; Srbice
- Died: 26 June 1993 (aged 85); Vienna
- Occupations: Journalist, writer and translator

Ruth von Mayenburg (1 July 1907 – 26 June 1993) was an Austrian journalist, writer and translator. In her earlier years, she was politically active in the Communist Party of Austria (Kommunistische Partei Österreichs, or KPÖ). Fleeing the Nazis, she lived in exile in the Soviet Union at Moscow's Hotel Lux, afterwards writing several books about her experiences there.

== Early years ==
Ruth von Mayenburg was born in Srbice, in Bohemia, in the Sudetenland (now Czech Republic). She was the younger daughter of Max Heinsius von Mayenburg (1857-1940), mine director and his wife, Baroness Lucie von Thümen (1874-1965). She grew up in a cosmopolitan, Austrian aristocratic family in the Bohemian city of Teplitz-Schönau. Her uncle was Ottomar Heinsius von Mayenburg, a pharmacist who became a millionaire with his invention of a brand of toothpaste, Chlorodont. At the age of 13, she became secretly engaged to Arthur Siegfried Hans Freiherr von Herder-Rauenstein (b. 1893) at the wedding of her sister, Felicie (1901-1993) to his brother Baron August Alexander Gottfried von Herder-Rauenstein (1891-1971). Von Herder later became an SA leader and lost his life in the Night of Long Knives.

She began studying architecture at the Dresden technical school. At the age of 23, she had a relationship with Alexander-Edzard von der Asseburg-Neindorf (b. 1906), but broke it off on the objection of General Kurt Freiherr von Hammerstein-Equord. She became involved with von Hammerstein-Equord, then head of the Army Command (Heeresleitung). In 1930, she moved to Vienna, Austria and lived with a friend of her mother, Baroness Antoinette Netka von Latscher-Lauendorf, née von Callenberg (1863-1944), widow of General Julius Freiherr von Latscher-Lauendorf (1846-1909). At that time Antoinette was the companion of Theodor Körner, Edler von Siegringen, who later served as 4th President of Austria. Through them, von Mayenburg was introduced to a circle of young socialists and became friends with intellectuals such as the writer Elias Canetti and Ernst Fischer, editor of the Arbeiter-Zeitung, who influenced her political views. She and Fischer were married in 1932.

In 1934, she and her husband took an active part against Engelbert Dollfuss in the Austrian Civil War, forcing them to flee Austria. They first went to Czechoslovakia, where her husband got a job working for the press office of the Comintern. While in exile, she became a member of the KPÖ, then outlawed. Von Mayenburg joined the Red Army and became a spy, traveling all over Germany and at one point sought out von Hammerstein-Equord to spy on him for the Soviet secret service. On one spy mission, she bumped into Lion Feuchtwanger on a train. When the Stalinist purges removed the leadership of von Mayenburg's division, her assignments stopped coming. She was a major, but unemployed.

In 1938, she and her husband Ernst Fischer went to the Soviet Union and lived in Room 271 on the fifth floor of Moscow's Hotel Lux, an international exile hotel during the Nazi era. They lived there until 1945. Fischer continued working for the Comintern.

During World War II, she served in the propaganda division of the Soviet Army.

== Postwar years ==
After von Mayenburg's return to Austria in 1945, she became general secretary of the Austrian-Soviet Society. She worked as a film dramaturge at Vienna Film, working on the Willi Forst film, Wiener Mädeln. She and Fischer were divorced in 1954.

In 1966, she resigned from the KPÖ and worked as a translator, while concentrating on her writing. She wrote several books about her experiences at the Hotel Lux and about the others, some of them, future heads of state, who lived there. She wrote about her own experiences there between 1938 and 1945, as well as the period before. Her book, Hotel Lux, which she spent five years researching and writing, was the very first history ever written about the hotel. Her book is not a deep analysis of Stalinism or the Great Purge, rather it shows life at the hotel with anecdotes and details of the terror and betrayal experienced by the exile community during most of the 1930s, and of their sexual mores and secrets, especially during the earlier years.

Von Mayenburg's second marriage was to the conservative journalist Kurt Dieman-Dichtl.

== Publications ==
- Blaues Blut und rote Fahnen. Revolutionäres Frauenleben zwischen Wien, Berlin und Moskau. (1969) ISBN 3-900478-72-4, Promedia Verlag (1993) (in German)
- Hotel Lux. C. Bertelsmann Verlag (1978) ISBN 3-570-02271-4 (in German)
- Hotel Lux. Das Absteigequartier der Weltrevolution. (1979) ISBN 3-492-11355-9 (Piper Verlag GmbH 1991) (in German)
- Hotel Lux – die Menschenfalle. Elisabeth Sandmann Verlag GmbH (2011) ISBN 3-938045-60-4 (in German)

== Sources ==
- Hans Magnus Enzensberger: Hammerstein oder der Eigensinn. Eine deutsche Geschichte. Frankfurt am Main: Suhrkamp (2008). ISBN 978-3-518-41960-1 (in German)
