= Ernst Fischer (writer) =

Austrian journalist, writer, politician (1899–1972)

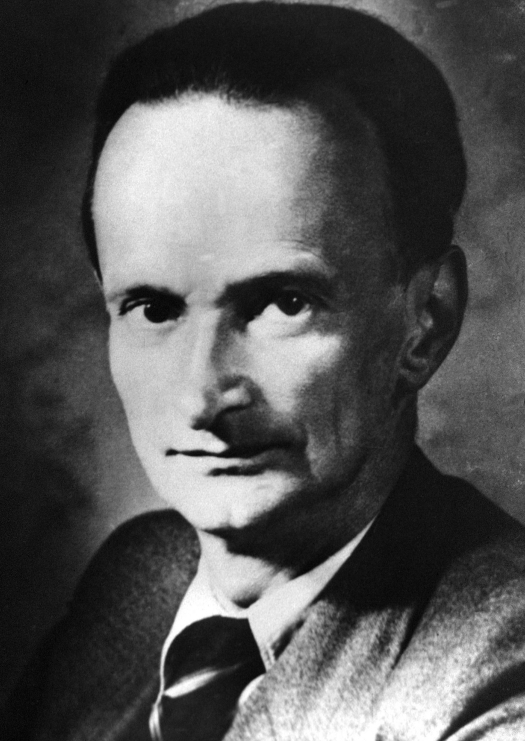
- Fischer in 1952
- Born: 3 July 1899; Komotau, Bohemia, Austria-Hungary (now Chomutov, Czech Republic)
- Died: 31 July 1972 (aged 73); Deutschfeistritz, Styria, Austria
- Education: University of Graz
- Occupations: Journalist, writer, politician
- Spouses: Ruth von Mayenburg (m. 1932; div. 1955) Louise Eisler (m. 1955)
- Children: Marina Fischer-Kowalski
- Relatives: Walter Fischer (brother)
- Writing career
- Pen name: Ernst Peter Fischer; Peter Wieden; Pierre Vidal; Der Miesmacher
- Language: German
- Notable work: The Necessity of Art (1959)

Ernst Fischer (3 July 1899 – 31 July 1972), also known under the pseudonyms Ernst Peter Fischer, Peter Wieden, Pierre Vidal, and Der Miesmacher, was a Bohemian-born Austrian journalist, writer, poet and politician.

== Biography ==
Ernst Fischer was born in Komotau, Bohemia, in 1899 as the son of the Imperial and Royal colonel and teacher of mathematics and descriptive geometry at military schools Josef Fischer and his wife Agnes. He served on the Italian Front in the First World War, studied philosophy in Graz and did unskilled labour in a factory before working as a provincial journalist and then on the Arbeiter-Zeitung from 1927. In 1932, he married Ruth von Mayenburg. Initially a social democrat, Fischer became a member of the Communist Party of Austria (Kommunistische Partei Österreichs or KPÖ) in 1934 after being disillusioned in liberal democracy for not being able to withstand fascism.

In 1934, after Fischer and his wife were involved in the Austrian Civil War, they had to leave Austria. They went to Czechoslovakia, where he began working for the Comintern as an editor. In 1938, they went to Moscow, where Fischer continued to work for the Comintern. They lived at Hotel Lux, a luxury hotel that had been built in 1911, and was taken over by the Communist Party after the October Revolution. Following Adolf Hitler's seizure of power, the hotel became a refuge for communist exiles, especially Germans. The Fischers lived there from 1938 until 1945.

When Fischer and his wife arrived at Hotel Lux, the Stalinist purges were still taking place and the exiles living at the hotel were living in a climate of fear and terror. The autumn after their arrival, Fischer came home from work one evening, looking terrified. Gustl Deutsch, an Austrian who had been arrested and imprisoned, had managed to smuggle him a note to alert him to the danger facing Fischer. Under torture, Deutsch had named Ernst Fischer as being involved in a plot against Stalin's life. Although the charges were completely false, by being accused, Fischer was in grave danger and he immediately sought help from Georgi Dimitrov, one of the leaders of the Comintern. Dimitrov replied, "I will be able to save you, but the others...?" Ernst Fischer, however, remained a loyal Stalinist.

After the war until his expulsion in 1969, Fischer continued to be an important figure in the KPÖ. He served as Communist minister of information in the immediate post-war provisional Renner government (27 April 1945 – 20 December 1945) and he published articles in Weg und Ziel, a monthly journal of the KPÖ.

In 195, Ruth von Mayenburg and Fischer were divorced, and Fischer married Louise Eisler. After having been expelled from the Austrian PEN for defending the suppression of the Hungarian uprising, Fischer was made editor-in-chief of Tagebuch : Wochenschrift für Kultur, Politik, Wirtschaft (Wiener Tagebuch from 1969) founded by the KPÖ in 1945.

Fischer's book, Erinnerungen und Reflexionen ("Memories and Reflections"), was released around the same time his ex-wife's book came out, Blaues Blut und rote Fahnen. Revolutionäres Frauenleben zwischen Wien, Berlin und Moskau ("Blue Blood and Red Flags. Revolutionary Female Life Between Vienna, Berlin and Moscow"). The two books covered the same period.

Fischer is particularly famous in the West for his book The Necessity of Art (1959). Here he took many of the commonplace concepts of Marxist artistic theory up to that point — art as labor, collective vs. individual, formalism and socialist realism — developing them in a wide-ranging essay on the history of art from magic and religion to the Romantics, to critical realism and art in the service of building socialism (critically) not just as state propaganda. The Necessity of Art has influenced many writers since the late 1950s, in particular Kenneth Tynan and John Berger, who wrote a new introduction to the Verso Books reprint.

In 1969, Fischer was expelled from the Austrian Communist Party for opposing the suppression of the Prague Spring, describing the resulting Warsaw Pact invasion of Czechoslovakia as "Panzer Kommunismus" ("tank communism"). Now, Fischer gradually moved towards the "undogmatic Marxists" in Austria, even renouncing the concept of a dictatorship of the proletariat.

Ernst Fischer died on 31 July 1972 in Deutschfeistritz.

== Literary works ==
- Vogel Sehnsucht. 1920
- Krise der Jugend. 1931
- Freiheit und Diktatur. 1934
- Vernichtet den Trotzkismus. Berlin 1937 (Trotzky Unmasked. New York 1937)
- Die Entstehung des österreichischen Volkscharakters. 1944
- Franz Grillparzer. 1948
- Der große Verrat. Drama 1950
- Roman in Dialogen. 1955 (with Louise Eisler-Fischer)
- Von der Notwendigkeit der Kunst. 1959 (English translation: The Necessity of Art. 1963)
- Kunst und Koexistenz: Beitrag zu einer modernen marxistischen Ästhetik. 1967 (translated as Ideology and Coexistence)
- Was Marx wirklich sagte. 1968 (translated as How to Read Marx)
- Erinnerungen und Reflexionen. 1969
- Das Ende einer Illusion. 1973
- Von Grillparzer zu Kafka. 1975
- Born in Austria.

== See also ==
- Tito–Stalin split
