= Tuğba Tekkal =

Turkish-German footballer (born 1985)

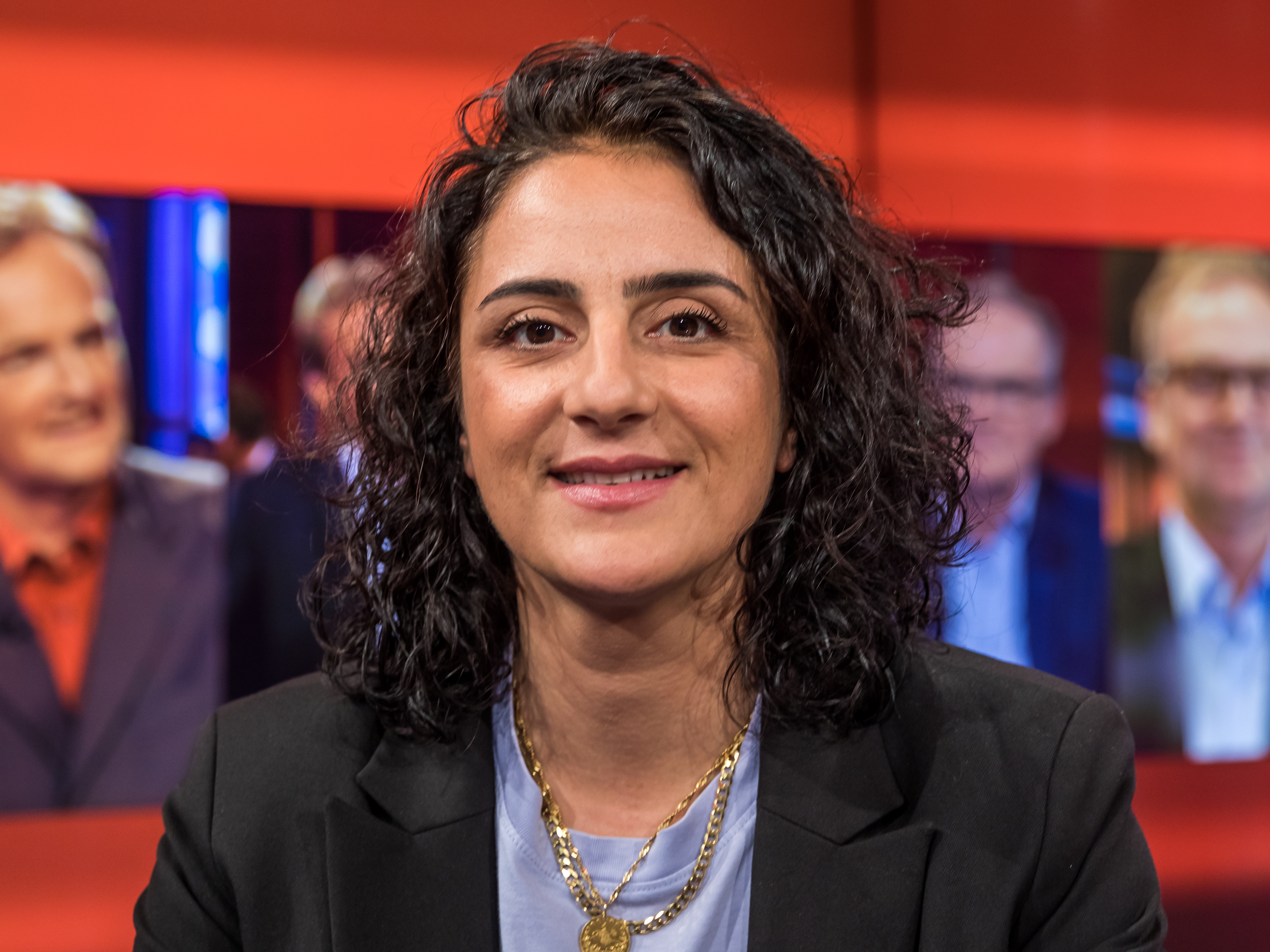
- Tuğba Tekkal (2022)

Personal information
- Date of birth: 5 March 1985 (age 41)
- Place of birth: Hanover, West Germany

Senior career*
Years	Team	Apps	(Gls)
2002–2007	TSV Havelse		
2008	Hamburger SV II		
2008–2009	Hamburger SV	21	(3)
2009–2011	1. FC Köln	29	(3)
2012–2017	1. FC Köln	111	(11)
2015	1. FC Köln II		
- * Club domestic league appearances and goals as of 2017

Tuğba Tekkal (born 5 March 1985) is a Turkish-German former professional women's association footballer and co-founder of a social enterprise.

== Personal life ==
Tuğba Tekkal was born to Turkish parents Fatma and Şeyhmus Tekkal in Hannover, West Germany on 5 March 1985. Her parents, of Kurdish descent and members of the Yazidi faith community, immigrated from a village in Diyarbalr Province, southeastern Turkey to West Germay in the 1970s. In West Germany, her parents worked as migrant workers (German: Gastarbeiter). Her father worked in the beginning as a truck driver, and later as a tiler. Her mother was a homeworker. She has ten siblings. Her sister Düzen Tekkal (born 1978) is an author, television journalist, filmmaker, war correspondent, political scientist, and social entrepreneur. Her brother Timur Tekkal (born 1981) is a German national rugby union player.

She grew up in Linden, a working-class district of Hanover, in a four-room apartment shared with her ten siblings. The family living room frequently served as a meeting place for politically active Yazidis; her father provided shelter to refugees and campaigned for the recognition of the religious community as a group facing political persecution.

Today, she lives in Cologne and Berlin. She advocates through her work for the empowerment of women and the values of the free democratic basic order. She regularly gives talks about her role as a woman, an athlete, and a German with a migration background.

== Club career ==
Tekkal started playing football at an early age, first on kick-about areas, and later for a club. For a long time, she kept her passion for the sport a secret from her parents. However, with the support of her siblings, she eventually managed to win her parents over to her hobby.

Tekkal played for TSV Havelse from 2002 to December 2007, and for Hamburger SV II (HSV) from January to June 2008. In 2007, she moved to the Frauen-Bundesliga club Hamburger SV. She made 21 appearances for HSV, scoring three goals. She was signed at the age of 20 following a successful trial, though she was only able to move to Hamburg after considerable effort to convince her initially skeptical parents. While playing in the 2. Frauen-Bundesliga for HSV, she received only a monthly expense allowance of around €175 and supported herself through a part-time job at a gym.

For the 2009–10 season, Tekkal moved to 1. FC Köln in the 2. Frauen-Bundesliga. She left the club at the end of the 2010–11 season, intending to end her athletic career to focus on her professional career as a sports and fitness specialist, but returned to the team during the 2011–12 winter break. After finishing as runners-up in the 2012–13 and 2013–14 seasons, she and the team achieved promotion to the Frauen-Bundesliga in 2014–15 by winning the 2. Frauen-Bundesliga Süd title undefeated.

In 2017, she decided to end her football career. The deciding factor was an ankle injury, she could not reconcile the lengthy rehabilitation process with her growing commitment to human rights.

In 2025, Tekkal ran unsuccessfully for the executive board of 1. FC Köln as part of a team with Carsten Wettich and Wilke Stroman.

== Social commitment ==
In 2015, Tekkal founded the non-profit humanitarian aid organization Háwar.help e.V. together with three of her sisters, including the journalist Düzen Tekka.[4] The organization was established to raise awareness of the genocidal actions of ISIS and the human rights violations suffered by the Yazidi community in Iraq and Syria. It has since grown into an organization that strengthens human rights both in crisis regions and in Germany, while advocating specifically for the rights of girls, regardless of whether they are Yazidi, Muslim, or Christian. In doing so, the organization aims to strengthen a democratic and open society. The association runs several projects. These include the Girls' football project "Scoring Girls" and the "Back to Life" women's empowerment center (German: Mädchen-Empowerment-Projekt), which offers psychosocial support, literacy and vocational skills courses, and educational workshops on topics such as women's rights and entrepreneurship for women and children who have escaped ISIS captivity in Iraq and Germany. In 2019, she established with her sister "Bildungsinitiative GermanDream" ("GermanDream Educational Initiative"), with the aim to convey the values of freedom and self-determination to young people and to prevent extremism with dialogues held at German schools. In 2021, Annalena Baerbock, the then leader of Alliance 90/The Greens and the Minister for Foreign Affairs of Germany, assumed the patronage of the "Back to Life" project.

== Recognition ==
Tekkal was decorated by the President of Germany with the Cross of the Order of Merit of the Federal Republic of Germany (German: Verdienstkreuz am Bande) on 1 December 2024.

== Honours ==
2. Frauen-Bundesliga
(gold) 2014–15 (1. FC Köln)
