= Elisabeth Sandmann Verlag =

Fiction and Non-fiction publishing house

The Elisabeth Sandmann Verlag is a fiction and nonfiction publishing house, which was founded in Munich in 2004 by the publisher Elisabeth Sandmann. Its program is themed Beautiful Books for Clever Women.

== History ==
Elisabeth Sandmann worked, before founding her own publishing house, for the publishers DuMont and Nicolai. Upon founding her publisher, she received support from her husband Friedrich-Karl Sandmann, to which the Elisabeth Sandmann Verlag shared a space, graphics and production organization and sales organization with his Zabert Sandmann Verlag. Financially, the two publishers, however, were just as independent as in the design of the publishing program. In autumn 2004, the first four titles appeared. In spring 2005, the book "Frauen, die lesen, sind gefährlich" (Women who read are dangerous) by Stefan Bollmann was released, and became the first bestseller of the publisher. Since spring 2013 there has been cooperation with the Insel Verlag, which released five titles from the publisher every six months in paperback. The first Paperback published through this cooperation was in March 2013, it was the book "Warum Lesen glücklich macht!" (Why does reading make you happy!) by Stefan Bollmann. In 2014, the publisher released for the tenth anniversary a book titled "Elisabeth", which as a limited edition tells the story of their publishing history. Early 2015, the Elisabeth Sandmann Verlag ended its cooperation with the Zabert Sandmann Verlag. In March 2015, the publishing house moved to Theresienstrasse in Munich and Uli Deurer from Augsburg took over the distribution.

In April 2016, it was announced that the Suhrkamp Verlag, owner of the Insel Verlag, acquired 51% of shares in the Sandmann publishing.

== Program ==
The overall program of the publishing house is under the motto "Beautiful books for clever women". It is divided into the divisions of biography and society, art and lifestyle and Keepsakes book. Another focus, which is not represented in its own division, is the area of Jewish history. The publisher try's to appeal to the taste of women, since Elisabeth Sandmann believes that they have other reading habits compared to men. Sandman concern is to entertain at a high level. Each year, about six to eight titles appear that are completely designed by the publisher itself. Bestsellers were "Frauen, die lesen, sind gefährlich" by Stefan Bollmann and "Die Damen mit dem grünen Daumen" (The ladies with the green thumb) by Claudia Lanfranconi and Sabine Frank, which was sold over 60,000 copies.

== Cooperations ==
The Elisabeth Sandmann Verlag cooperates with the Insel Verlag, where paperback editions of titles from the publisher appear as since 2013. In addition, the Elisabeth Sandmann Verlag is a cooperation partner of the Royal Collection Trust since 2011.
