= Ottomar von Mayenburg =

Inventor of toothpaste

- Born: 5 December 1865; Schönheide, Kingdom of Saxony
- Died: 24 July 1932 (aged 66); Gut Roseneck am Wörthersee, Austria
- Occupation: Pharmacist

Gustav Ottomar Heinsius von Mayenburg (5 December 1865 – 24 July 1932) was a German pharmacist. He invented the Chlorodont toothpaste for the German market.

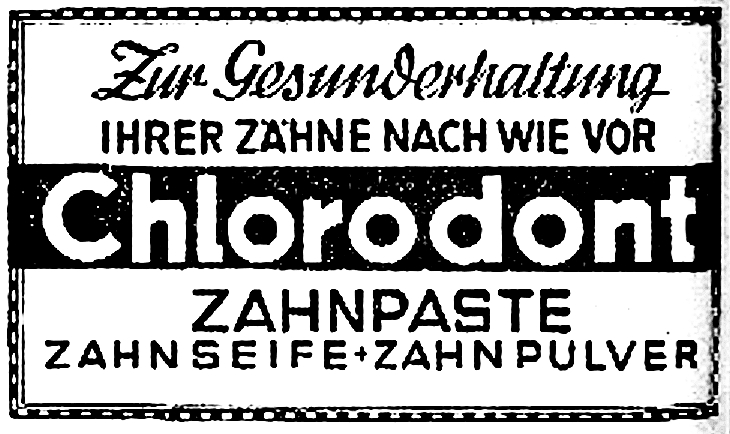
Chlorodont advertising, in 1949, newspaper

== Life ==
Mayenburg studied botany pharmaceuticals at Leipzig University. After finishing his university studies he worked as a pharmacist in Dresden. In 1907 while in Dresden, he invented a toothpaste, which he named Clorodont. He filled tubes with his new toothpaste and sold it to customers. His new product competed with the Kalodont toothpaste manufactured by Carl Sarg and also the Pebco toothpaste manufactured by Beiersdorf. He was very successful and founded the Leowerke company to sell Clorodont. In the 1920s over 1,000 people worked for the Leowerke company. At that time, Von Mayenburg lived with his family in the Eckberg Castle near Dresden. He was an uncle of Ruth von Mayenburg.

== Film ==
- „Die Zahnpasta des Herrn von Mayenburg“. film by Götz Goebel (30 minutes.) for SWR „Patente & Talente“ (29 December 2007)

== Literature ==
- Rolf Mahlke: Die Zahnpasta des Herrn von Mayenburg, in: 'Die ZahnarztWoche' (DZW) 51-52/2007 pages 18f
