= Pan-European identity =

Personal identification with Europe

Pan-European identity is the sense of personal identification with Europe, in a cultural or political sense. The concept is discussed in the context of European integration, historically in connection with hypothetical proposals, but since the formation of the European Union (EU) in the 1990s increasingly with regard to the project of ever-increasing federalisation of the EU. The model of a "pan-European" union is the Carolingian Empire, which first defined "Europe" as a cultural entity as the areas ruled by the Roman Catholic Church, later known as "Medieval Western Christendom" (which extended its scope further eastwards to the shores of the Baltic Sea during the course of the Middle Ages). The original proposal for a Paneuropean Union was made in 1922 by Count Richard von Coudenhove-Kalergi, who defined the term "pan-European" as referring to this historical sense of the western and central parts of continental Europe encompassing the cultures that evolved from medieval Western Christendom (i.e. Catholic and Protestant Europe, with the exception of the British Isles) instead of the modern geographic definition of the continent of Europe. Coudenhove-Kalergi saw the pan-European state as a future "fifth great power", in explicit opposition to the Soviet Union, "Asia", Great Britain and the United States (as such explicitly excluding both the British Isles and the areas that were influenced by Byzantine Christendom, which are usually considered a part of geographical Europe, from his notion of "pan-European").

After 1948, an accelerating process of European integration culminated in the formation of the EU in 1993. In the period from 1995–2020, the EU has been enlarged from 12 to 27 member states, far beyond the area originally envisaged for the "pan-European" state by Coudenhove-Kalergi (with the exception of Switzerland), its member states accounting for a population of some 447 million, or three-fifths of the population of the entire continent. In the 1990s to 2000s, there was an active movement towards further consolidation of the European Union, with the introduction of symbols and institutions usually reserved for sovereign states, such as citizenship, a common currency (used by 20 out of 27 members), a flag, an anthem and a motto (In Varietate Concordia, "United in Diversity"). An attempt to introduce a European Constitution was made in 2004, but it failed to be ratified; instead, the Treaty of Lisbon was signed in 2007 in order to salvage some of the reforms that had been envisaged in the constitution.

A debate on the feasibility and desirability of a "pan-European identity" or "European identity" has taken place in parallel to this process of political integration. A possible future "European identity" is seen at best as one aspect of a "multifaceted identity" still involving national or regional loyalties. Two authors writing in 1998 concluded that "In the short term, it seems that the influence of this project [of European integration] will only influence European identity in certain limited niches and in a very modest way. It is doubtful if this will do to ensure a smooth process of ongoing European integration and successfully address the challenges of the multicultural European societies." Even at that time, the development of a common European identity was viewed as rather a by-product than the main goal of the European integration process, even though it was actively promoted by both EU bodies and non-governmental initiatives, such as the Directorate-General for Education and Culture of the European Commission. With the rise of EU-scepticism and opposition to continued European integration by the early 2010s, the feasibility and desirability of such a "European identity" has been called into question.

== History ==
Pan-Europeanism, as it emerged in the wake of World War I, derived a sense of European identity from the idea of a shared history, which was taken to be the source of a set of fundamental "European values".

Typically, the "common history" includes a combination of Ancient Greece and Ancient Rome; the feudalism of the Middle Ages; the Hanseatic League, the Renaissance; the Age of Enlightenment; 19th-century liberalism and different forms of socialism, Christianity and secularism; colonialism; and the World Wars.

"Europe" as a cultural sphere is first used during the Carolingian dynasty to encompass the Latin Church (as opposed to Eastern Orthodoxy). The first mention of the concepts of "Europe" and "European" dates back to 754 in the Mozarabic Chronicle. The Chronicle contains the earliest known reference in a Latin text to "Europeans" (europenses), whom it describes as having defeated the Saracens at the battle of Tours in 732.

In the 19th century, Italian Giuseppe Mazzini and French Victor Hugo would call for the unification of Europe.

The oldest European unification movement is the Paneuropean Union, which was founded in 1923 with the publishment of Richard von Coudenhove-Kalergi's book Paneuropa. He also became its first president (1926–1972), followed by Otto von Habsburg (1973–2004) and Alain Terrenoire (from 2004). The movement initiated and supported the "integration process" pursued after World War II, which eventually led to the formation of the European Union. Notable "Paneuropeans" include Konrad Adenauer, Robert Schuman and Alcide De Gasperi.

== Identity factors ==
It has been for long a matter of discussions to know whether or not this feeling of belonging was shared by a majority of Europeans, geographically speaking, and the strength of this feeling.

There are discussions as well about the question of the objective factors or "Europeanness". An approach underlines how, for being European, a person would at least have to:

- be a citizen of a state, located by stipulation, to be geographically within Europe;
- speak a language which is officially accepted as one of the official languages of that state;
- share a historical destiny with other people, within that state, speaking the aforementioned language;
- share a cultural pattern with other such people, where the cultural pattern is seen as consisting of similar cognitive, evaluative and emotional elements".

Usually, four steps are considered as conditions in the building of cultural and political identity:

- The recognition of a "self" distinct from others, "them".
- The recognition that this "self", this "identification" is in opposition to "them". In order for an identity to thrive, there must be a challenge, a competitive edge or conflicts of interests.
- The establishment of a separate political identity involves a cognitive simplification of the world, where most events are interpreted in dual categories such as "European" versus "non-European".
- The establishment of common expected and desired goals. Such goals can be elaborated as utopian systems or models, like the federalist and confederalist conceptions of a new European order, or as partial working solutions to pragmatically felt needs, such as those postulated by neo-functionalists.

One of the clearly stated political objectives of the European Union is the deepening of the European identity feeling.

=== European values ===
Especially in France, "the European idea" (l'idée d'Europe) is associated with political values derived from the Age of Enlightenment and the Republicanism growing out of the French Revolution and the Revolutions of 1848 rather than with personal or individual identity formed by culture or ethnicity (let alone a "pan-European" construct including those areas of the continent never affected by 18th-century rationalism or Republicanism).

The phrase "European values" arises as a political neologism in the 1980s in the context of the project of European integration and the future formation of the European Union. The phrase was popularised by the European Values Study, a long-term research program started in 1981, aiming to document the outlook on "basic human values" in European populations. The project had grown out of a study group on "values and social change in Europe" initiated by Jan Kerkhofs, and Ruud de Moor (Catholic University in Tilburg). The claim that the people of Europe have a distinctive set of political, economic and social norms and values that are gradually replacing national values has also been named "Europeanism" by McCormick (2010).

"European values" were contrasted to non-European values in international relations, especially in the East–West dichotomy, "European values" encompassing individualism and the idea of human rights in contrast to Eastern tendencies of collectivism. However, "European values" were also viewed critically, their "darker" side not necessarily leading to more peaceful outcomes in international relations.

The association of "European values" with European integration as pursued by the European Union came to the fore with the eastern enlargement of the EU in the aftermath of the Cold War.

The Treaty of Lisbon (2007) in article 2 lists a number of "values of the Union", including "respect for freedom, democracy, equality, the rule of law and respect for human rights including the rights of persons belonging to minorities", invoking "a society in which pluralism, non-discrimination, tolerance, justice, solidarity and equality between women and men prevail".

=== Cultural and linguistic identity ===
Defining a European identity is a very complex process. From outside, "Europeanness" would be a thing for a Chinese or an American, but on the internal plan geography is not sufficient to define Europe in the eyes of Europeans. According to Jean-Baptiste Duroselle, "there has been, since men think, an immense variety of Europes". Paul Valéry cites three major heritages to define the European identity : the Greek democracy, the Roman Law, and the Judeo-Christian tradition. Yet Emmanuel Berl criticizes this thesis as reductive, since it supposes a level of "Europeanness", decreasing for West to East. According to him, Europe is shape-shifting, and no culture historically prevails over another, and European Islam, which concerns around 8% of the population, is one of the many sides of European identity.

Five languages have more than 50 million native speakers in Europe: Russian, German, French, Italian and English. While Russian has the largest number of native speakers (more than 100 million in Europe), English has the largest number of speakers in total, including some 200 million speakers of English as a second language. There is no final account of all European languages, but the sole EU recognizes 24 official languages. For some, the linguistic diversity is constituent of European identity.

== Formation ==
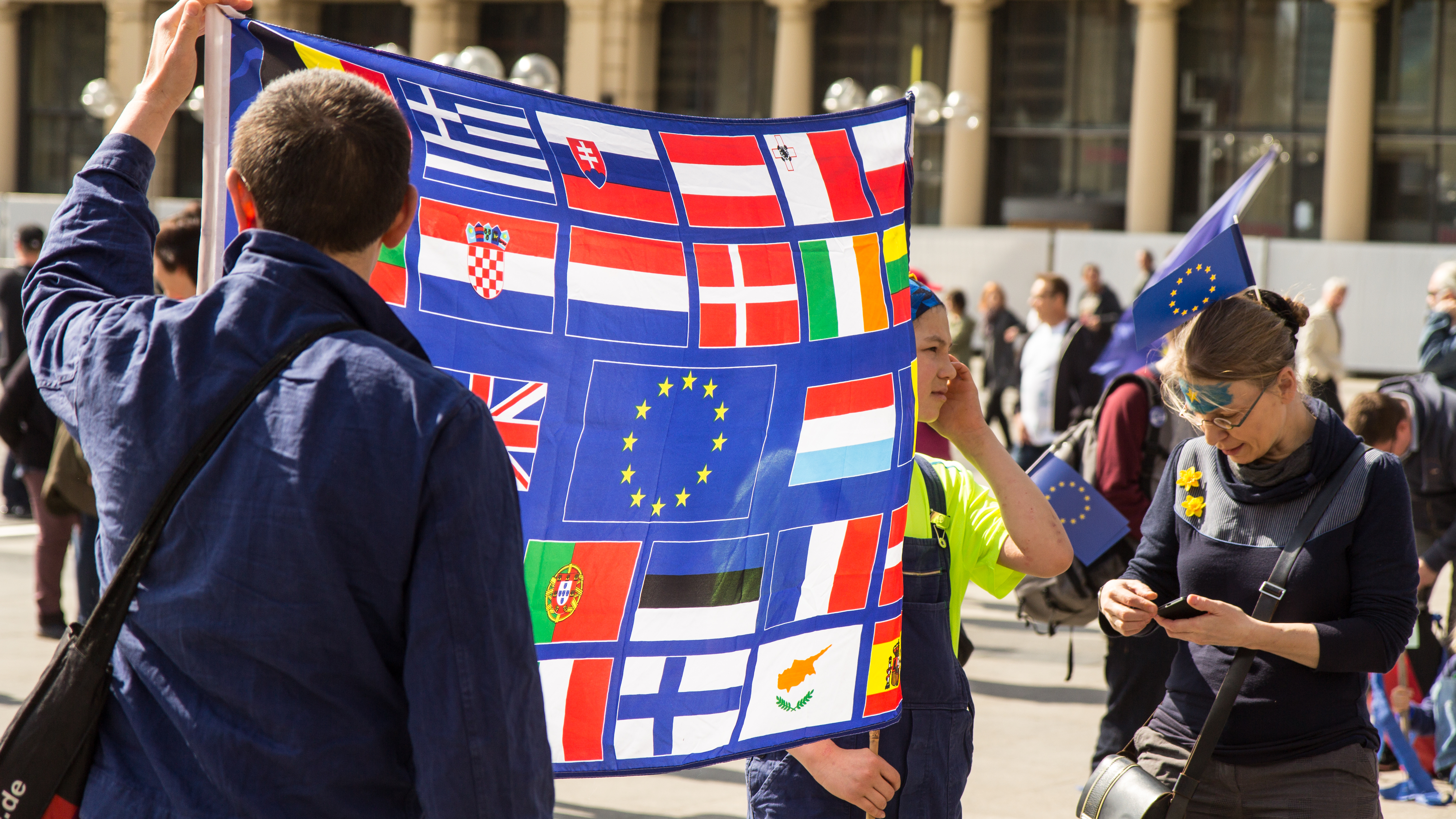
Pro-European participants attending the Pulse of Europe rally in Cologne, Germany (2017)

The European institutions made several concrete attempts to reinforce two things: identity contents (what is Europe in people's minds?) and identity formation (what makes people feel European?). The .eu domain name extension was introduced in 2005 as a new symbol of the European Union identity on the World Wide Web. The .eu domain's introduction campaign specifically uses the tagline "Your European Identity". Registrants must be located within the European Union.

On the cultural plan, the European Union began a policy in the 70s with the directive "Television without Frontiers", which allowed free trade of TV programs and guaranteed more than half of the air time to European operas. The culture programme finances other cultural activities in order to strengthen the European common identity. The European Union also bet on symbols: the flag, the anthem ("Ode to Joy" from the final movement of Beethoven's 9th Symphony), the motto "In varietate concordia", the two Europe days. Great cultural unifying events are organised, such as the European heritage days, or the election of the Capital of Culture. The youth mobility has been encouraged since the launching of the Erasmus programme in 1987, which has permitted students to go to 33 European countries.

The challenge of communication, to make the European project more understandable to the 500 million citizens, in 24 languages, has also been addressed: in 2004, the first Vice-President of the Commission has the Communication Strategy portfolio. The common values are reasserted through the judicial action of the European Court of Human Rights. Linked to this, the European Union funds many surveys (such as Eurobarometer) and scientific studies, to improve its identity-building policies. A collection of such studies is for example The development of European Identity/Identities : Unfinished Business

Aspects of an emerging "European identity" in popular culture may be seen in the introduction of "pan-European" competitions such as the Eurovision Song Contest (since 1956), the UEFA European Championship (since 1958) or, more recently, the European Games (2015). In these competitions, it is still teams or representatives of the individual nations of Europe that are competing against one another, but a "European identity" many argued to arise from the definition the "European" participants (often loosely defined, e.g. including Morocco, Israel and Australia in the case of the Eurovision Song Contest), and the emergence of "cultural rites" associated with these events. In the 1990s and 2000s, participation in the Eurovision Song Contest was to some extent perceived as a politically significant confirmation of nationhood and of "belonging to Europe" by the then-recently independent nations of Eastern Europe.

Pan-European events not organised along national lines include the European Film Awards, presented annually since 1988 by the European Film Academy to recognize excellence in European cinematic achievements. The awards are given in over ten categories, of which the most important is the Film of the year. They are restricted to European cinema and European producers, directors, and actors.

The Ryder Cup golf competition is a biennial event, originally between a British and an American team, but since 1979 admitting continental European players to form a "Team Europe". The flag of Europe was used to represent "Team Europe" since 1991, but reportedly most European participants preferred to use their own national flags. There have also been attempts to use popular culture for the propagation of "identification with the EU" on the behalf of the EU itself. These attempts have proven controversial. In 1997, the European Commission distributed a comic strip titled The Raspberry Ice Cream War, aimed at children in schools. The EU office in London declined to distribute this in the UK, due to an expected unsympathetic reception for such views. Captain Euro, a cartoon character superhero mascot of Europe, was developed in the 1990s by branding strategist Nicolas De Santis to support the launch of the Euro currency.

In 2014, London branding think tank, Gold Mercury International, launched the Brand EU Centre, with the purpose of solving Europe's identity crisis and creating a strong brand of Europe. In 2005, the Institut Aspen France proposed the creation of a European Olympic Team, which would break with the existing organisation through National Olympic Committees. In 2007, European Commission President Romano Prodi suggested that EU teams should carry the European flag, alongside the national flag, at the 2008 Summer Olympics – a proposal which angered eurosceptics. According to Eurobarometer surveys, only 5% of respondents think that a European Olympic team would make them feel more of a 'European citizen'.

== Perception ==
The risk, defining a European identity, is to close up from other cultures that would not correspond to pre-defined criteria. To face this difficulty, vagueness is necessary: the Treaty of Lisbon mentions, for example, "cultural, religious and humanist inheritance". Moreover, it would be illusory to impose a principle of cultural homogeneity to states with various national identities. Jean-Marc Ferry considers that the European construction developed new differentiation, between citizenship and nationality for example, with the birth of post national citizenship in 1992. According to Raymond Aron, the construction can predate the European sentiment, but the last is essential to avoid a fictional Europe, a Europe that would only be a meaningless word in which the people do not recognize themselves. This idea is backed by Jacques Delors, who wrote in 1992 that it is needed to "give Europe a soul, [...] a spirituality, a meaning" beyond the simple economic and administrative realities.

== Public opinion ==
The Eurobarometer surveys show that European and national identities tend to add rather than rule themselves out. In 2009, 60% felt French and European, a feeling that dominated in every socio-political group except the National Front supporters. Yet this tendency is not geographically homogeneous: 63% of Britons favoured their sole nationalities (which has been one of the main explanations of the Brexit vote), against 27% of Luxembourgers. The 2012 Eurobarometer survey reported that 49% of those surveyed described the EU member states as "close" in terms of "shared values" (down from 54% in 2008), 42% described them as "different" (up from 34% in 2008). During these surveys, the respondents are asked which notions they spontaneously associate with the EU. Democracy, Human Rights, Freedom of movement and the euro are the most cited. There are divergences between generations: those who knew war directly or through their parents' narrations mention peace, while the younger evoke market economy. The idea that identity is built through opposition to other groups is also confirmed since 60% of Europeans state they rather or fully agree with the idea that "compared with other continents, it is distinctly easier to see what Europeans have in common in terms of values". A study from 2022 shows that the extent of the division over European identity are greater than that of national identity and even comparable to the magnitude of religious divide in most of countries included in the study. Moreover, it shows that outgroup derogation dominates ingroup favoritism in 22 out of 25 countries.

The Eurobarometer regularly measures the feeling of being a citizen of the European Union. The latest available sentiment data was published in May 2026.

Feeling of Being a Citizen of the European Union (Eurobarometer Spring 2026)
Country	Yes (in %)	No (in %)
European Union	75	25
Austria	72	28
Belgium	74	25
Bulgaria	57	43
Croatia	68	32
Cyprus	76	24
Estonia	75	24
Finland	83	16
France	65	34
Germany	81	19
Greece	56	44
Ireland	86	14
Italy	67	33
Latvia	80	20
Lithuania	79	20
Luxembourg	92	7
Malta	83	17
Netherlands	74	26
Portugal	89	11
Slovakia	81	19
Slovenia	78	22
Spain	86	14

=== Historical evolution ===
The Eurobarometer has regularly polled European Union citizens on their feeling of being a citizen of the EU. If several values are available for the same year, they were aggregated to form a single yearly value, based on the biannual Standard Eurobarometer values. The table below shows the evolution of this sentiment for the European Union.

Feeling of Being a Citizen of the European Union (EU average)
Year	Yes (in %)	No (in %)
2025	74	25.5
2024	74	25
2023	72	27
2022/23	74	25
2021/22	71.5	27.5
2020/21	72	27
2019	71.5	27.5
2018	70.5	28.5
2017	69	30
2016	66.5	32.5
2015	65.5	32.5
2014	64	34.5
2013	60.5	38.5
2012	62	37
2011	62	36
2010	62	37

== See also ==
- Brand EU
- Captain Euro
- Charlemagne Prize
- Continentalism
- Eurasianism
- Eurocentrism
- Europe a Nation
- Europe Day
- The European Dream (2004)
- European integration
- Europeanisation
- Europeanism
- Euroscepticism
- Federalisation of the European Union
- Fourth Reich
- NEOS – The New Austria and Liberal Forum
- Pan-Asianism
- Pan-European nationalism
- Paneuropean Union
- Panhispanism
- Pan-nationalism
- Pre-1945 ideas on European unity
- Potential Superpowers – European Union
- Pro-Europeanism
- Symbols of Europe
- Symbols of the European Union
- United States of Europe
- Volt Europa
