= Gold Mercury International Award =

Italian peace, governance, and commerce award

- Date: 1961 – present
- Location: London
- Country: England
- Presented by: Gold Mercury International
- Website: www.goldmercury.org

The Gold Mercury International Award is presented by Gold Mercury International, an International nongovernmental organization (INGO) and think tank. The original Mercurio D'oro awards were given by an association of Italian journalists to Italian individuals and companies. Later the awards were extended to Europe and then became international. Awards are given to prominent people and organizations for contributions to world peace, good governance and development of global commerce. Award-giving ceremonies were held in cities such as Brussels, Moscow, Karachi, Madrid, Caracas, Addis Ababa, Beijing and Washington. The INGO that administers the awards moved to London, England in the late 1990s. The current President and Secretary General is Nicolas De Santis, son of Eduardo De Santis, the founder of Gold Mercury International.

The Gold Mercury Award 2024 for Humanitarian Affairs was presented to Sergio Scapagnini and the Street Children of the World, in a ceremony in Kolkata, India.

The Gold Mercury Award 2025 for Peace and Environmental Stewardship was awarded to His Holiness the 14th Dalai Lama.

== Foundation ==
The Centro Giornalistico Annali, an association of Italian journalists, started the Gold Mercury (Mercurio D'oro) awards in 1961. The group supported the promotion of trade and economic cooperation. The award is named after Mercury, the god of commerce. Eduardo De Santis was one of the founders. The award was originally meant to publicize Italian companies that promoted good governance practices. The Italian President Giuseppe Saragat (in office 1964–71) was also given the award.

In 1970 the President of Italy became the sponsor, and the award took on a European scope. In 1975 it became international. By 1982 the award had been given to sixteen world leaders and to newspapers such as Le Monde. The award-giving organization was formally called the International Organization for Cooperation (IOC).

The Kabul New Times said in 1980 that the authorized commission of the Gold Mercury International Organization gave the prize to "individuals and organizations of the world who have taken fruitful steps in expanding economic and technical cooperation with other countries. A 1982 description said Gold Mercury International annual awards went to individuals, including Heads of State, for contributions to world peace, and to "individuals, companies or organizations for contributing to development of international relations and productive development."

== Cold War Era ==
=== Conference locations ===
The international award ceremonies were held in different locations. The fifteenth annual ceremony of the Gold Mercury International Award in 1975 was held in the Gothic Room of the Brussels City Hall. Moscow hosted the 20th conference in 1980, where more than 120 foreign companies participated. More than one hundred Soviet firms, organizations, statesmen and public figures were given Gold Mercury International Awards at this event. The 21st International Conference of the Gold Mercury International Association (GMIA) was held in Sofia, Bulgaria at the end of September 1981. Lorenzo Galo was Secretary-General of the Executive Committee of the GMIA at the time. A conference was held in Karachi on 7 April 1982. Another awards ceremony was held in Ethiopia in 1982. This was the first time this event had been held in an African country. The 1984 ceremony took place in Beijing on 14 April 1984.

=== Award winners ===
UNESCO was awarded the 1978 Gold Mercury International Award and Diploma for its efforts to promote development and international co-operation. Talal Abu-Ghazaleh, Chairman and Founder of Talal Abu-Ghazaleh Organization was given also an award in 1978, presented by Khalifa bin Salman Al Khalifa, Prime Minister of Bahrain. Delfa Associates was given Italy's annual Gold Mercury International Award for 1978 at a special ceremony in Mexico. The Amersham, UK refrigeration company was recognized for their contribution to promoting and fostering international cooperation in their field.

In October 1980 the award was presented to Soviet General Secretary Leonid Brezhnev for an "outstanding contribution to strengthening peace and developing international cooperation". The Russian firm TMP won an award that year. Textilimpex was another award winner at the 20th conference in Moscow. The Afghan National Petroleum Institute also received a Gold Mercury prize in Moscow. The institute's president attributed the honor to "untiring efforts and hard work of workers, technicians, engineers and all toiling employees of Afghan National Petroleum Institute and disinterested cooperations of friendly country of USSR."

Edward Seaga, Prime Minister of Jamaica (1980–89), received the Gold Mercury International Award in Venezuela in 1981. The Mexican conductor Enrique Bátiz Campbell was the first Latin American artist to receive the award. On 29 September 1981 in Sofia, Bulgaria the United Nations Industrial Development Organization was given an "Ad Honorem" award for contributing to development of international relations and strengthening world peace. The Latvian Shipping Company was given a 1981 Gold Mercury International Award for developing shipping, harbor economy and cooperation in strengthening contacts with foreign countries.

In 1982 an award was given in Karachi to the Korea Trade Promotion Corporation (KOTRA) for its participation in expanding global economic participation. At the same event the Singapore International Chamber of Commerce was given the Gold Mercury International Award ad honorem for encouraging international trade. The Pakistani President General Muhammad Zia-ul-Haq received the Gold Mercury international award for peace and cooperation from G. Lorenzo Galo, the Secretary-General of Gold Mercury International. Galo praised Zia's contributions to international peace and cooperation. The Pakistan Yearbook noted that Pakistan was the first non-western government to be given the award, due to its support of "the Islamic teachings of universal love, peace, brotherhood and welfare and prosperity of the entire mankind." Rear Admiral Abdul Waheed Bhombal received an "ad-honorarium" Gold Mercury International Award on behalf of the Pakistan National Shipping Corporation. Aga Khan IV also received an "Ad Personam" award at this ceremony.

The 22nd Gold Mercury Awards were given to the Ethiopian Athletics Federation, and Ydnekatchew Tessema. Tessima was President of the Confederation of African Football and member of the International Olympic Committee (IOC) in Ethiopia. The archaeologist J. Desmond Clark, one of the early pioneers in Africa of systematic fieldwork, was given an individual award in 1982. Anthropologists Francis Clark Howell, Donald Johanson and Tim D. White also received awards, Clark, Johansen and White were present at the ceremony. The Ethiopian Poet Laureate Tsegaye Gabre-Medhin was awarded a Gold Mercury Ad Persona Award. The sculptor Tadesse Belaineh Habtemariam also received an Ad-Personam award in Addis Ababa. Erte Tekle is another Ethiopian artist who received an award that year. Thomas R. Odhiambo, founder of the African Academy of Sciences, was given an award. McKinley Conway also won an award in Addis Ababa. The International Center for Promotion of Enterprises (ICPE) was a recipient in recognition of the work it had done to support African countries. The International Livestock Center for Africa received two awards.

Chandrika Prasad Srivastava, a senior official in the Indian government and founder of the Sahaja Yoga movement, received an Ad Personam award in 1984. James P. Grant, Executive Director of the United Nations Children's Fund, was given the Gold Mercury International Award in 1984 by International Organization for Co-operation. The Chinese Premier Zhao Ziyang was awarded the Gold Mercury International Peace Emblem in 1984. In 1984 Lorenz Maria Gallo, secretary-general of Gold Mercury International, also presented a medal to Wang Pinqing, who promised to continue to try to expand trade, economic cooperation and friendship between China and other countries. In 1985 EFE, the Spanish news agency, received an award for "increasing contribution to knowledge and cooperation among the people of Latin origin" at the Special Conference for the Peace and International Cooperation that was organized by the International Organization for Cooperation (IOC) and held at Brazzaville. That year Rajsoomer Lallah of Mauritius received an ad personam award for contribution to development and human rights law.

== Later history ==
In the late 1990s Gold Mercury International relocated to London. As of 2004 the organization had an annual budget of about US$1 million and a staff of 25 people. Leaders who have received the award include US Presidents Gerald Ford and Ronald Reagan and King Juan Carlos I of Spain. President Zine El Abidine Ben Ali of Tunisia received the 2004 Gold Mercury International award for "Peace, Cooperation and Solidarity". Kerry Kennedy, founder of the Robert F. Kennedy Center for Justice and Human Rights, received the award for Humanitarian Action in 2006. In 2007 Ellen Johnson Sirleaf, President of Liberia, received the award for Peace and Global Security. Colombian President Álvaro Uribe received the Peace and Security award in 2009. The award was presented in Bogotá by Juan Míguel Villar, president of the Spanish Obrascón Huarte Lain construction group, which is active in Colombia. Since 2008, Gold Mercury International has been a participant in the United Nations Global Compact. In June 2013 Pietro Sebastini, Italian Ambassador to Spain, presented the founder of Gold Mercury International, Eduardo De Santis, the medal of the Orden of Commendatore on behalf of Giorgio Napolitano, President of Italy.

In 1990 Eduardo De Santis, an original founder of Gold Mercury, set up Megavisionary Labs, an advisory firm specializing in enterprise visioneering.

Nicolas De Santis, son of Eduardo De Santis, held senior positions in Twelve Stars, beenz.com and was the co-founder of Opodo, an online travel agency. In a 2010 interview Nicolas De Santis said Megavisionary Labs used parts of the intellectual frameworks for vision future visioneering developed by Gold Mercury.

In February 2012 it was announced that Prince Hassan bin Talal of Jordan had joined the Gold Mercury International advisory board. A 2012 brochure showed Eduardo De Santis as Chairman of Gold Mercury International and Nicolas De Santis as President and Secretary General. Álvaro Uribe Vélez and Kerry Kennedy were both members of the 36-person Award Nomination and Selection Committee. Other members of Gold Mercury International as of 2013 included Enrique Barón Crespo, past president of the European Parliament. In 2014 it was reported that Gold Mercury International, now headed by Nicolas De Santis and Enrique Barón, had launched the Brand EU initiative to improve the brand of the European Union and thus strengthen the union.

The Gold Mercury Award 2024 for Humanitarian Affairs was presented to philanthropist and movie producer Sergio Scapagnini and the Street Children of the World. The 2024 Award raises the plight of the more than two hundred million street children worldwide that rely on the streets for survival.

The Gold Mercury Award 2025 for Peace and Environmental Stewardship was awarded to His Holiness the 14th Dalai Lama for advancing a culture of peace, compassion and sustainability.
