= Gold Mercury International =

British-based international NGO

- Formation: 1961; 65 years ago
- Founder: Eduardo De Santis
- Type: International nongovernmental organisation (INGO), think tank
- Headquarters: Mayfair, London, England
- Location: United Kingdom
- Fields: Visionary Governance, Future Worldbuilding, international and economic cooperation
- President: Nicolas De Santis
- Website: www.goldmercury.org

Gold Mercury International is an International nongovernmental organisation (INGO), think tank and the institution that presents the Gold Mercury International Award. The organisation focuses on Visionary Governance and Future Worldbuilding. Through its Awards, Summits and international initiatives, it advances dialogue and cooperation on global governance and international affairs.

Gold Mercury was founded in 1961 in Rome by Eduardo De Santis and the headquarters were relocated to Mayfair, London, in the 1990s.

== The Gold Mercury Awards ==
The Gold Mercury International Award is presented across critical areas of international importance, including peaceful relations, humanitarian efforts, global health, economic development, science and innovation, culture, and sustainability.

The Gold Mercury Award 2025 for Peace and Environmental Stewardship was awarded to His Holiness the 14th Dalai Lama. The Gold Mercury Award 2024 for Humanitarian Affairs was presented to Sergio Scapagnini and the Street Children of the World, in a ceremony in Kolkata, India.

In 2006 Kerry Kennedy, President of the Robert F. Kennedy Human Rights Foundation, received the Gold Mercury Award for Humanitarian Affairs. Colombian President Álvaro Uribe received the Peace and Security award in 2009.

== Megavisionary Council ==
The Megavisionary Council is Gold Mercury's international advisory body, bringing together leaders from government, business, science, technology, academia, culture and civil society to contribute strategic perspectives on global governance and long-term challenges. Members of the Council include former President of the European Parliament Enrique Barón Crespo, former President of Bulgaria Simeon Saxe-Coburg-Gotha, former President of Kyrgyzstan Roza Otunbayeva, and Indian film director Goutam Ghose, who joined the Council in July 2026.
