= Motto of the European Union =

In varietate concordia ('United in diversity') is the official motto of the European Union (EU), adopted in 2000. Its translations in the other 24 official languages of the EU have equal standing. It is inspired by its Latin-language version coined by the Italian Nobel prize winner Ernesto Teodoro Moneta: In varietate concordia or In varietate unitas, which is also used as a compromise. It is one of the newest symbols of the European Union, alongside the European flag and anthem but, unlike most, it is specific to the EU rather than originating from the Council of Europe.

According to the European Commission, "It signifies how Europeans have come together, in the form of the EU, to work for peace and prosperity, while at the same time being enriched by the continent's many different cultures, traditions and languages."

== History ==
The European motto was first adopted in May 2000 as "Unity in diversity" through a non-official process since it was a contest involving 80,000 students from the 15 countries that were members of the European Union at the time (a.k.a. "EU-15"): Austria, Belgium, Denmark, Finland, France, Germany, Greece, Ireland, Italy, Luxembourg, Netherlands, Portugal, Spain, Sweden & United Kingdom.

=== La Prairie's project (1998–1999) ===
In April 1998, French newspaper Ouest-France's Patrick La Prairie proposed the organisation of a European mottoes contest for the, then 15, EU members' secondary education students. This event was meant as a 50-year celebration of Founding father of the European Union Robert Schuman's famous declaration about a supranational Community which eventually led to the creation of the actual European Union.

Back in 1998, the European Union had already a flag of Europe, and anthem of Europe and was about to launch the euro, its currency; it lacked a motto, hence, the contest proposal. Journalist La Prairie was in charge of Ouest-France's Press-School mission and found two sponsors, World War II French museum Memorial de Caen and France Telecom, then a state-owned company. 40 newspaper partners were found in France as well as in the remaining countries of EU-15; with at least a newspaper per country, e.g. La Repubblica in Italy, Le Soir in Belgium, Irish Times in Ireland, Berliner Zeitung in Germany and The Guardian in UK.

The project was officially launched on 31 March 1999 with the opening of the une devise pour l'Europe contest's official website managed by France Telecom. The website featured pedagogic files, created by the operation's general Office located at the Caen Memorial, and teachers oriented pitches and registration forms available in the eleven official European languages (plus Catalan). The English-language version, called "A motto for Europe", had a website. The contest's slogan was "The only prize will be to write a page of Europe's History" (La seule récompense sera d’avoir écrit une page d’histoire de l'Europe).

=== A motto for Europe (1999–2000) ===
"A motto for Europe" contest logo

In September 1999, a contest was held at the start of the 1999–2000 school year to invent a motto for the European Union. 2,575 classes were involved, with students ranging from ages ten to nineteen. The main rule was that the motto had to consist of a sentence of no more than twelve words, with an accompanying explanation of no more than 1,500 characters written in the class's local language. An English version of the explanation was also required, since the teachers used this language to communicate between themselves. National and European winners were selected the following year.

By the contest deadline, 15 January 2000, 2016 mottoes had applied. A lexical analysis of this 400,000-word corpus was done by Taylor Nelson Sofres to reveal the most popular terms used by the young Europeans, which were: "Europe", "peace", "unity", "union", "together", "future", "difference", "hope", "solidarity", "egality", "liberty", "diversity", and "respect". This study was later used by the jury during the national selection.

In February 2000, each member of EU-15's media partner managed a top 10 national mottoes selection to later submit it to a second jury in charge of the European selection. These 142 mottoes were all translated in the 11 official European languages.

On 11 and 12 April 2000, the European Media Jury based at the Memorial of Caen, chose 7 mottoes among the late February selection (one voice per country). Those were next submitted to a final European Grand Jury in Brussels.

=== Proclamation at the European Parliament (2000) ===
On 4 May 2000 almost 500 schoolchildren from fifteen classes of the EU-15 (top class of each national selection) were gathered at the European Parliament in Brussels to assist the proclamation of the motto chosen that day by the 15-member Grand Jury including former Chancellor of Austria Franz Vranitzky, former Italian Minister of Foreign Affairs Susanna Agnelli, former Belgian astronaut Dirk Frimout, former Minister of Foreign Affairs of Denmark Uffe Ellemann-Jensen, Luxembourgish historian Gilbert Trausch, former German President of the Bundestag Rita Süssmuth, Irish Senator Mary Henry, former British President of the European Commission Roy Jenkins, and former French President of the European Commission Jacques Delors.

The motto was displayed on a blue background located behind President of the European Parliament Nicole Fontaine. Unité dans la diversité, French for Unity in diversity was translated in the eleven official languages of the EU plus Latin, In varietate concordia, as read out by Fontaine. The motto had been devised by Luxembourgish youngsters and prefaced by chairman Delors who added "Europe:" to it. Probably by coincidence, the same motto had been used in the title of a Workshop held in the European Centre for Modern Languages (Graz) on 23–25 April 1998: "East meets West: Unity in Diversity". The title was chosen by Dónall Ó Riagáin, on behalf of the organizers, the European Bureau for Lesser-Used languages (EBLUL). He attributes the expression to John Hume, the leader of the Social Democratic and Labour Party in Northern Ireland when he first used it, in about 1983, perhaps basing it on the text "E pluribus unum"’ on the Seal of the USA.

Since it had to be submitted for official approval by the fifteen Chiefs of State of the European Council at Santa Maria da Feira on 19 and 20 June 2000, President Nicole Fontaine stated: « I want it to become the motto of all institutions, just as we have a flag and anthem ».

The six rejected mottoes were "Peace, Liberty, Solidarity", "Our differences are our strength", "United for peace and democracy", "United in liberty", "An old continent, a new hope", and "All different, all Europeans!"

"Unity in diversity" has been the national motto of Indonesia since 1945 (Bhinneka Tunggal Eka, in ancient Javanese) and on 27 April 2000 post-apartheid South Africa adopted a similar motto (ǃke e꞉ ǀxarra ǁke) in ǀXam (a sleeping San language), which also translates in English as "Unity in diversity".

=== European Council speech (2000) ===
On 19 June 2000, at Santa Maria da Feira, Portugal, 24th President of the European Parliament Nicole Fontaine concluded her official opening speech with the introduction of the European Union motto (Unité dans la diversité):

Pending the outcome of a much broader debate on the future of a Europe of 28, those citizens need clear ideas: open and lasting institutions and "unity in diversity", to quote the motto adopted a few weeks ago by 80000 young Europeans. official English translation by the European Parliament

Since then this motto was used by several European officials during their speeches at Strasbourg, including President of European Commission Romano Prodi on 4 July 2001 « our real strength lies in "unity in diversity" », Italian rapporteur Giorgio Ruffolo on 4 September 2001 « Therefore, the expression 'unity in diversity' has been chosen as the motto of the report », Austrian member of the European Parliament Paul Rübig on 10 April 2002 « Europe is, after all, about unity in diversity » or Spanish Member of the European Parliament Raimon Obiols on 4 September 2003 « Yesterday the President of the European Convention ended his speech by evoking the future European motto: united in diversity ».

=== European Constitution (2004) ===
In 2004, the motto was written into the failed European Constitution's Article I-8 about the EU's symbols.

Article I-8

The symbols of the Union
The flag of the Union shall be a circle of twelve golden stars on a blue background.
The anthem of the Union shall be based on the 'Ode to Joy' from the Ninth Symphony by Ludwig van Beethoven.
The motto of the Union shall be: 'United in diversity'.
The currency of the Union shall be the euro.

Europe day shall be celebrated on 9 May throughout the Union.

The motto translations were slightly modified since 2000, including the English-language version becoming « United in Diversity ». Though this constitutional treaty was eventually rejected by the French and Dutch voters on 29 May and 1 June 2005.

=== Europe Day (2005) ===
On 9 May 2005, the European Commission issued promotional items such as a postcard featuring the symbols of Europe: the European flag, the European anthem, the European motto (now "United in diversity") and the Europe Day. Only lacked the European currency which was in the Treaty of 2004 but not yet constitutional. The official Europe Day poster also used the modified motto "United in Diversity".

The same day the new motto (Unie dans la diversité) was proclaimed by 1,000 youngsters at the Memorial of Caen as a 5-year celebration. These words were now written in the European Constitution project that was though rejected through referendum few days later.

=== Treaty of Lisbon (2007) ===
The Treaty of Lisbon, concluded in 2007, does not contain any article dedicated to symbols of the European Union. It retained much of the 2004 treaty but omitted the articles defining the European symbols, namely the flag, anthem and motto. It does however contain a declaration by 16 member states who affirmed their recognition of the symbols. In response to the omission of the symbols from the main treaty text, the European Parliament took the avant-garde in using the symbols as it had done in adopting them in the first place. Parliament changed its internal rules to make more use of the symbols. In the case of the motto, it would be printed on all Parliamentary documents.

== Official translations ==
=== The first 11 official EU languages and Latin (2000) ===
The original French motto Unité dans la diversité was translated in the other ten official EU languages plus Latin when it was proclaimed the motto for Europe on 4 May 2000.

- Danish: Forenet i mangfoldighed
- Dutch: In verscheidenheid verenigd
- English: United in diversity
- Finnish: Moninaisuudessaan yhtenäinen
- French: Unité dans la diversité
- German: Einheit in Vielfalt
- Greek: Ενότητα στην πολυμορφία
- Italian: Unità nella diversità
- Portuguese: Unidade na diversidade
- Spanish: Unidad en la diversidad
- Swedish: Förenade i mångfalden
- Latin: In varietate concordia

=== 24 official EU languages (2013) ===
The motto was translated into the 23 languages in which there were official translations of the European Constitution on 29 October 2004. The treaty, and hence the motto, was officially translated into Bulgarian and Romanian despite the fact they would not join for a further three years. Irish was not included but is on the list here as it became an EU language in 2007. Croatian has been included since 1 July 2013. The following are the official translations as of March 2017:

- Bulgarian: Единство в многообразието
  (Edinstvo v mnogoobrazieto)
- Croatian: Ujedinjeni u različitosti
- Czech: Jednotná v rozmanitosti
- Danish: Forenet i mangfoldighed
- Dutch: In verscheidenheid verenigd
- English: United in diversity
- Estonian: Ühinenud mitmekesisuses
- Finnish: Moninaisuudessaan yhtenäinen
- French: Unie dans la diversité
- German: In Vielfalt geeint
- Greek: Ενωμένοι στην πολυμορφία
  (Enoméni stīn polymorfía)
- Hungarian: Egység a sokféleségben
- Irish: Aontaithe san éagsúlacht
- Italian: Unità nella diversità
- Latvian: Vienota dažādībā
- Lithuanian: Suvienijusi įvairovę
- Maltese: Magħquda fid-diversità
- Polish: Zjednoczona w różnorodności
- Portuguese: Unida na diversidade
- Romanian: Uniți în diversitate
- Slovak: Zjednotení v rozmanitosti
- Slovene: Združena v raznolikosti
- Spanish: Unida en la diversidad
- Swedish: Förenade i mångfalden

== Unofficial translations ==
There exist translations of the motto into languages other than the 23 official languages of the EU.

=== Languages of EU member states ===
- Aragonese: Unita en a dibersidat
- Asturian: Xunida na diversidá
- Basque: Aniztasunean bat eginik
- Breton: Unanet el liested
- Cantabrian: Aunía ena diversidá
- Catalan: Units en la diversitat
- Corsican: Uniti in a diversità
- Friulian: Unîts inte diversitât
- Galician: Unida na diversidade
- Luxembourgish: A Villfalt gëeent
- Mirandese: Ounida na dibersidade
- Sardinian: Umpare in sa diversidade
- Sassarese: Uniddi in la dibessiddai
- Silesian: Skuplowańi we roztůmajtośći
- Turkish: Çeşitlilikte birlik
- West Frisian: Ienheid yn ferskaat

=== Languages of EU membership candidates ===
Further translations in the EU candidates' official languages were elaborated by the European Union or the candidate States themselves:

- Icelandic: Sameinuð í fjölbreytileika
- Macedonian: Обединети во различноста (Obedinemi vo različnosma)
- Serbian: Уједињени у различитости (Ujedinjeni u različitosti)

=== Languages of former EU members ===
- Scots: Unitit in diversitie
- Scottish Gaelic: Aonachd ann an eugsamhlachd
- Welsh: Yng nglym mewn gwahaniaeth

== See also ==
- Bhinneka Tunggal Ika
- E pluribus unum
- Symbols of Europe
- Unity in diversity
