= Maria Cuadra =

Spanish actress

- Portrait of María Cuadra
- Born: María Jesús Cuadra Pérez; 24 December 1934 (age 91); Madrid, Spain
- Occupation: Actress
- Years active: 1950–1990
- Spouse: Eduardo De Santis
- Children: 3, including Nicolas De Santis

María Cuadra (born María Jesús Cuadra Pérez, 24 December 1934) is a Spanish actress who has worked in theatre, film and television. Her screen work includes Spanish and international productions, and her stage career includes productions of works by Jean Anouilh, Harold Pinter and Luigi Pirandello.

== Career ==
=== Theatre ===
Cuadra had a substantial career in theatre, appearing in productions from the late 1950s onwards. The Spanish Centre for Documentation of Performing Arts and Music records ten stage productions featuring her between 1958 and 1977. These include Buenas noches, Bettina (1958), El amor es un potro desbocado (1959), Colomba (1960), Premio para un asesinato (1962), Sí, quiero (1963), El amante and La colección (both 1967), El regreso and La idea fija (both 1970), and Los gigantes de la montaña (1977). The productions included works by playwrights such as Jean Anouilh, Harold Pinter and Luigi Pirandello.

One of her early stage productions was El amor es un potro desbocado, written and directed by Luis Escobar. Cuadra played Doña Jimena in the production, which premiered at the Teatro Lara in Madrid on 16 January 1959. A contemporary review quoted in the theatre archive praised her stage presence and performance.

Cuadra was interviewed during the 1973 San Sebastián International Film Festival, where she discussed her experience and work as an actress.

In September 2010, a radio interview with Cuadra was broadcast by Onda 4 Jimena in connection with a screening of Los tres etcéteras del coronel, in which she had appeared.

=== Film and television ===
Cuadra appeared in Spanish and international film productions, including Platero y yo, Último encuentro, Vuelve San Valentín, La canción del olvido, The Price of Power, Marinai, donne e guai and I tromboni di Fra' Diavolo, alongside Ugo Tognazzi and Raimondo Vianello.

A 1964 newspaper profile reported on Cuadra's film work and her preparations for another production, describing her as having already appeared in fourteen films.

She was also included among the actors selected by filmmakers associated with Spanish auteur cinema in a historical survey of Spanish film published by the Spanish Academy of Cinematographic Arts and Sciences in 2015.

== Personal life ==
She is the daughter of Spanish bullfighter Antonio Cuadra Belmonte. She married Italian actor and producer Eduardo De Santis, whom she met during the filming of Las aeroguapas. They had three children: Natasha, Nicolas De Santis and Antonella.

== Selected filmography ==
- Juan Simón's Daughter (1957)
- Marisa la civetta (1957)
- Le belle dell'aria (1957)
- Amore a prima vista (1958)
- Marinai, donne e guai (1958)
- Le tre "eccetera" del colonnello (1960)
- I tromboni di Fra' Diavolo (1962)
- Noche de verano (1963)
- Black Humor (1965)
- Fury of Johnny Kid (1967)
- The Last Meeting (1967)
- Granada, addio! (1967)
- A Complicated Girl (1969)
- The Price of Power (1969)
