= Black Humor (film) =

1965 film

Umorismo in nero
- Written by: Guy de Maupassant (story), Jean Aurenche (screenplay)
- Release date: 1965
- Countries: Italy; France; Spain
- Language: Spanish

Black Humor (Italian title: Umorismo in nero, lit. Humour in black) is a 1965 black comedy anthology film directed by Claude Autant-Lara, Giancarlo Zagni and José María Forqué.

== Plot ==
- 1st segment- "The Bug": A peasant woman tormented by a bug in her ear barges into a healer's house. (After a short story by Maupassant) (dir. Autant-Lara)
- 2nd segment- "The Crow": A strange widow comes to enquire about the services of a new marriage agency. (dir. Zagni)
- 3rd segment- "Miss Wilma": In a circus, trapeze artist Wilma is going to get rid of a rival during a 'magic act', performed by an amateur. (dir. Forqué)

== Cast ==
- Sylvie ... La mère Belhomme – segment 1 'La Bestiole" (as Louise Sylvie)
- Pierre Brasseur ... Le guérisseur – segment 1 'La Bestiole'
- Jean Richard ... Polyte – segment 1 'La Bestiole'
- Pauline Carton ... La Rapet – segment 1 'La Bestiole'
- Paulette Dubost ... segment 1 'La Bestiole'
- Robert Arnoux ... segment 1 'La Bestiole'
- Jacques Marin ... segment 1 'La Bestiole'
- Jean Martinelli ... segment 1 'La Bestiole'
- Pierre Repp ... segment 1 'La Bestiole'
- Emma Penella ... Miss Wilma – segment 2 'La Mandrilla – Miss Wilma'
- José Luis López Vázquez... Jacinto – segment 2 'La Mandrilla – Miss Wilma'
- Leo Anchóriz ... Gayton – segment 2 'La Mandrilla – Miss Wilma'
- Madame Parlow ... segment 2 'La Mandrilla – Miss Wilma'
- Agustín González ... segment 2 'La Mandrilla – Miss Wilma'
- Alicia Hermida ... segment 2 'La Mandrilla – Miss Wilma'
- Alida Valli ... la veuve - segment 3 'La Cornacchia'
- Folco Lulli ... le comte Altiero Ripoli - segment 3 'La Cornacchia'
- Maria Cuadra ... Maria - segment 3 'La Cornacchia'

== Reception ==
"The segment 'The Crow' – which, with its tasteful macabre surrealism, is undoubtedly the best of the anthology film", according to an Italian review of the time, while another contemporary commentator wrote, "The three episodes, different in setting and tone, have in common a certain taste for situations and inventions of macabre comedy. The meticulous environmental and psychological description of the first story (La bestiola) is contrasted by the cumbersomeness of the second episode (La mandrilla), ending with the facile surrealism of the third (La cornacchia).’"
