= The Price of Power =

1969 Spaghetti Western

- Italian poster
- Directed by: Tonino Valerii
- Screenplay by: Massimo Patrizi; Ernesto Gastaldi; Tonino Valerii
- Produced by: Bianco Manini
- Starring: Giuliano Gemma; Warren Vanders; Maria Cuadra; Ray Saunders; Benito Stefanelli; Fernando Rey; José Suárez; Van Johnson
- Cinematography: Stelvio Massi
- Edited by: Franco Fraticelli
- Music by: Luis Enríquez Bacalov
- Production companies: Patry Film; Films Montana
- Distributed by: Consorzio Italiano Distributori Indipendenti Film (CIDIF)
- Release dates: 18 December 1969 (Italy); 9 June 1970 (Spain)
- Running time: 111 minutes
- Countries: Italy; Spain
- Language: English
- Box office: ₤1.273 billion

The Price of Power (Italian: Il prezzo del potere) is a 1969 Spaghetti Western directed by Tonino Valerii and starring Giuliano Gemma. The film's plot is set against the backdrop of the assassination of president James Garfield.

== Plot ==
Bill Willer tries to get revenge against the killers of his father while at the same time trying to prevent an assassination plot against president James Garfield. The president ends up dying from an assassin's bullet, but Willer's further quest for revenge is ultimately more successful.

== Cast ==
- Giuliano Gemma as Bill Willer
- Warren Vanders as Arthur MacDonald
- Benito Stefanelli as Sheriff Benny Jefferson
- Fernando Rey as Pinkerton
- Ray Saunders as Jack Donovan
- Michael Harvey as Jeff Wallace (uncredited)
- Van Johnson as James A. Garfield
- José Suárez as Chester A. Arthur
- Maria Cuadra as Lucretia Garfield
- Antonio Casas as Mr. Willer
- Manuel Zarzo as Nick
- Julio Peña as Governor of Texas
- José Calvo as Dr. Strips

== Production ==
The film's concept was conceived by Massimo Patrizi, Luigi Comencini's brother-in-law, and serves as an adaptation of the story of John F. Kennedy's assassination in the form of a Western. Patrizi also imposed another true story in his script, the murder of James A. Garfield in 1881. Garfield is played by Van Johnson, with José Suárez playing Vice President Chester A. Arthur. Spanish actress Maria Cuadra plays Lucretia Garfield, the President's wife. In her role she portrays pretty much the role of Jackie Kennedy as a glamorous President's wife. Even in the assassination scene, Cuadra seems to emulate many of the same actions from Jackie Kennedy's last moments with John F. Kennedy in Dallas in 1963.

Although the opening titles of the film credit the story and screenplay only to Patrizi, the film was rewritten by Valerii and Ernesto Gastaldi. Valerii commented that he did not remember Patrizi's script word-for-word, but described it as "extremely basic, whereas Gastaldi and I deepened it. We established the essential themes to develop, introduced the character played by Fernando Rey, the banker who is also the assassination's mandator, and so on." Gastaldi stated that "Patrizi's treatment was simply thrown in the bin, but the producer had signed a contract with him which stated that he was to be credited as the sole author of the script. Since I didn't care about my name in the titles, I had no problem writing the script and not signing it."

== Release ==
The Price of Power was released theatrically in Italy on December 10, 1969, by Cidif. It grossed a total of 1,273,858,000 lire on its domestic release in Italy. It received a release in Spain on June 9, 1970, as La muerte de un presidente.

== Bibliography ==
- Cox, Alex (2009). 10,000 Ways to Die: A Director's Take on the Spaghetti Western. Oldcastle Books. ISBN 978-1-84243-304-1.
- Curti, Robert (2016). Tonino Valerii: The Films. McFarland. ISBN 978-1476664682.
- Hughes, Howard (2010). Spaghetti Westerns. Harpenden: Kamera Books. ISBN 978-1-84243-303-4.
