= Melissa Odabash =

American fashion designer and former model

Melissa Odabash MBE
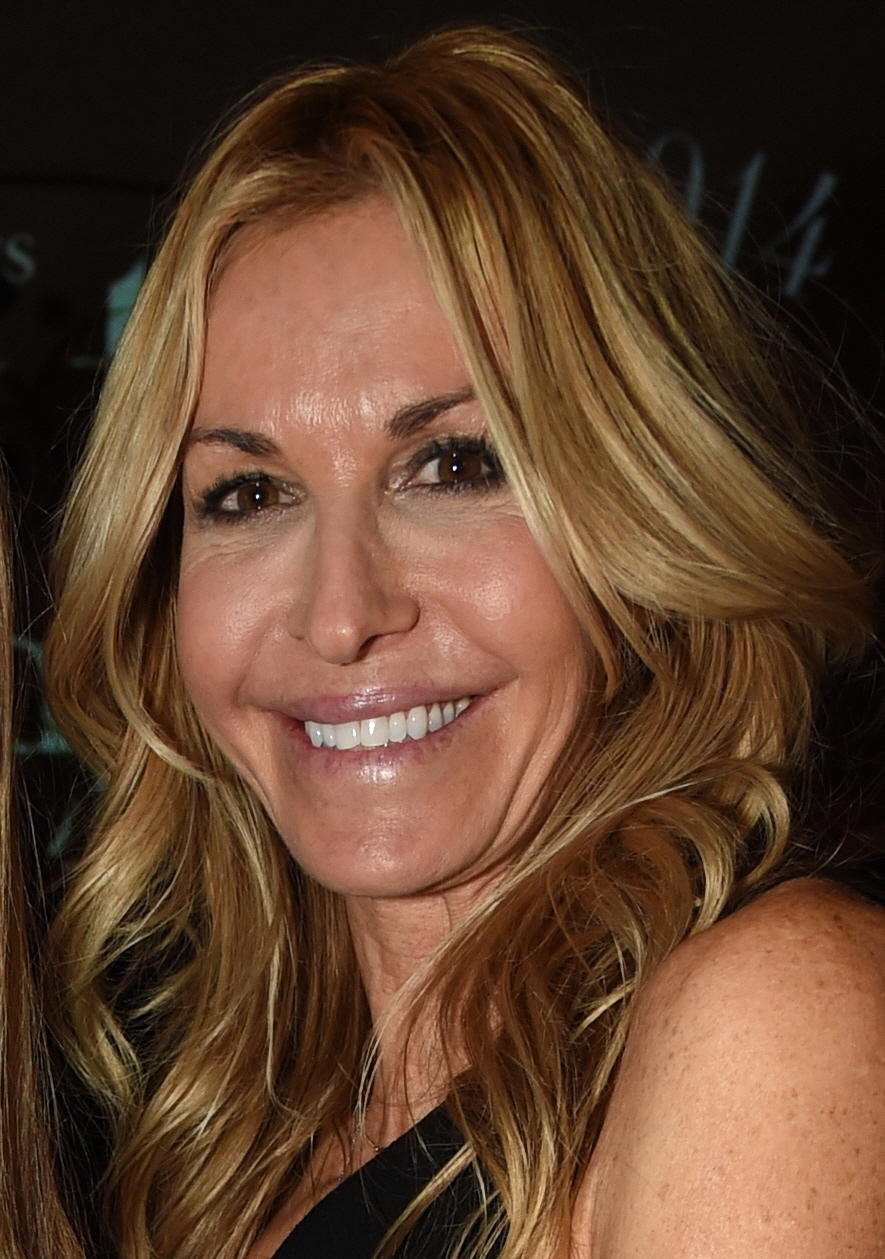
- Odabash in 2014
- Label: Melissa Odabash
- Spouse: Nicolas De Santis
- Children: 2 daughters

Melissa Ann Odabash is an American fashion designer and former model based in London. She is known for her swimwear designs and has been noted by Vogue as creating the "Ferraris of swimwear." Odabash's designs have been worn by Beyoncé, Kate Moss, Sienna Miller, Rihanna, Gwyneth Paltrow, Rosie Huntington-Whiteley and the Princess of Wales.

== Early life ==
Odabash grew up in New Jersey. She is the daughter of Arthur R. (died 1998) and Lois Odabash of Demarest, New Jersey, and has four siblings (Robin, Jamie Lynn, Scott and Megan). Arthur R. Odabash was a real-estate developer, and a co-founder and the vice-chairman of the Jersey Bank for Savings in Montvale, New Jersey, and the chairman of the Bergen County Department of Planning and Economic Review. Her paternal grandfather was of Turkish origin who came to the United States at a young age.

== Career ==
Odabash began her career living and working in Italy as a model. She decided to start creating her own swimwear by hand, selling them to independent boutiques in Milan and gaining global recognition. She opened a store in Notting Hill, London in 2007, followed by one in Chelsea. Her brand, which includes swim, beach & ready-to-wear collections is distributed in over 48 countries and retailed in over 250 department stores.

In 2004, Odabash collaborated with Speedo, creating a collection of one-off swimwear pieces to celebrate their 75th anniversary. She has also collaborated with Gwyneth Paltrow. In 2012, Odabash developed a line of unisex hats to raise money and awareness for the Elton John AIDS Foundation.

In 2014, Odabash won Salon International de la lingerie's Designer of the Year award and was awarded as one of the 50 Most Influential People of London at The London Lifestyle Awards; as well as winning Retailer of the Year in 2015. She is a guest speaker at business schools in the UK and US including Condé Nast's College of Fashion & Design and Harvard Business School.

In June 2021, she was appointed an honorary member of the Order of the British Empire (MBE), for services to international swimwear fashion. Her Honours presentation at Buckingham Palace took place in November 2022.

In 2026, Odabash was awarded the Designer Icon Award by the Icons Hall of Fame during Swim Week in Miami.

== Personal life ==
Odabash is married to Nicolas De Santis, an Italian businessman, and they have two adult daughters.

== See also ==
- List of swimwear brands
