= Kerry Kennedy =

American human rights activist (born 1959)

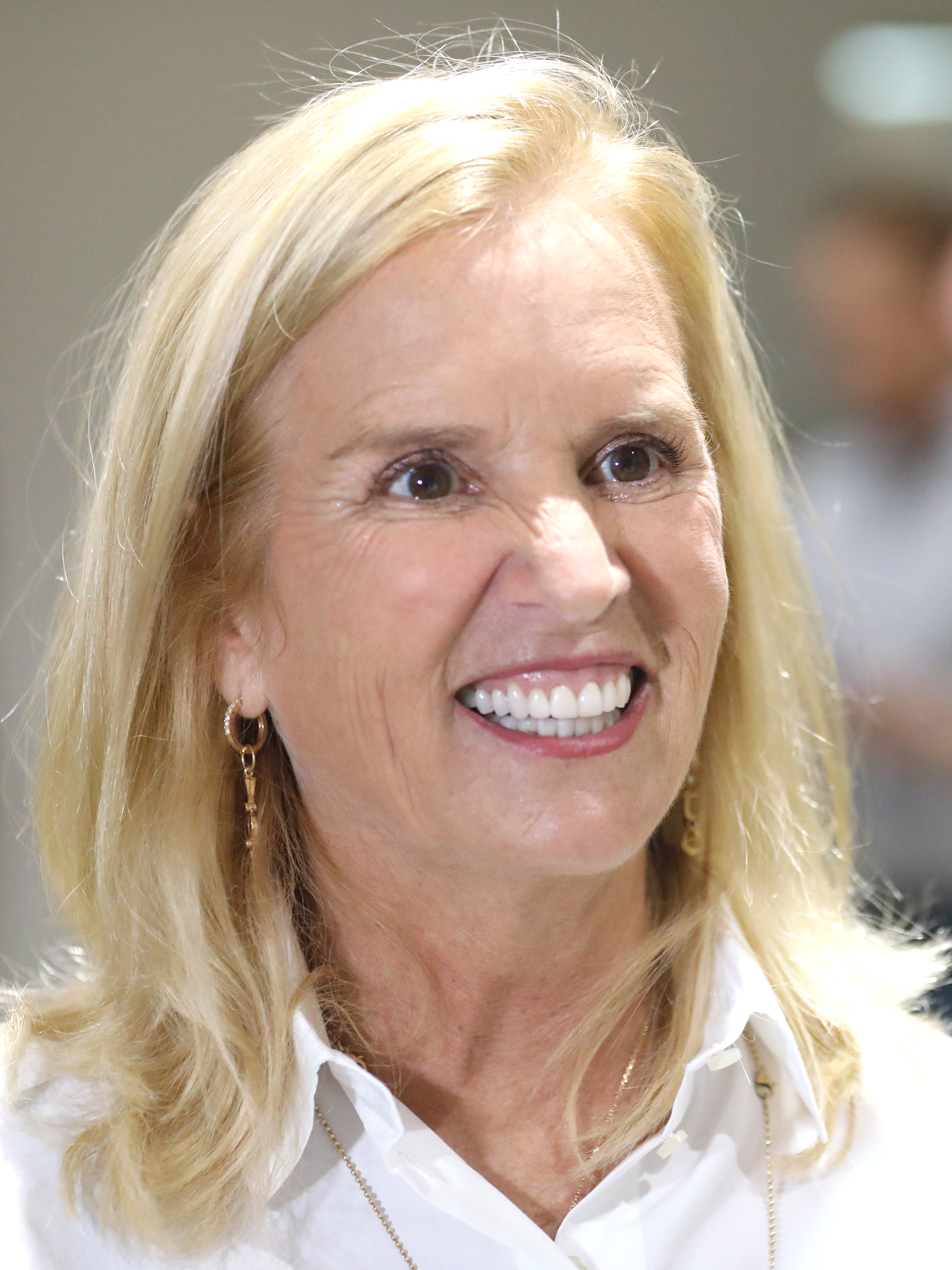
- Kennedy in 2024
- Born: Mary Kerry Kennedy; September 8, 1959 (age 67); Washington, D.C., U.S.
- Other name: Kerry Kennedy-Cuomo
- Education: Brown University (BA); Boston College (JD)
- Occupations: Lawyer; author; human rights activist
- Known for: Robert F. Kennedy Human Rights (President)
- Political party: Democratic
- Spouse: Andrew Cuomo (m. 1990; div. 2005)
- Children: 3
- Parents: Robert F. Kennedy; Ethel Skakel
- Family: Kennedy family

Mary Kerry Kennedy (born September 8, 1959) is an American lawyer, author, and human rights activist. Kennedy is a daughter of former U.S. Attorney General Robert F. Kennedy and Ethel Kennedy, sister of Secretary of Health and Human Services Robert F. Kennedy Jr., and a niece of former U.S. President John F. Kennedy and former U.S. Senator Ted Kennedy. She is the president of Robert F. Kennedy Human Rights, a non-profit human rights advocacy organization.

== Early life and education ==
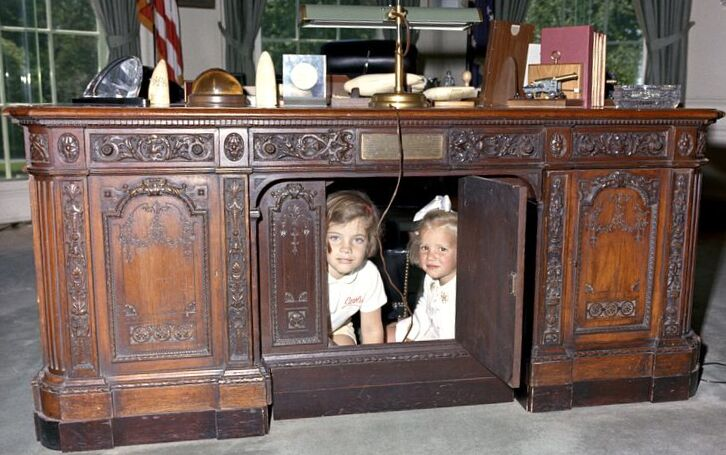
Caroline and Kerry Kennedy inside the Resolute Desk, June 1963

Mary Kerry Kennedy was born on September 8, 1959, in Washington, D.C., to parents Robert F. Kennedy and Ethel Skakel. Three days after her birth, her father resigned as chief counsel of the Senate Rackets Committee to run his brother's campaign for the presidency. Kennedy spent her childhood between the family's homes in McLean, Virginia and Hyannis Port, Massachusetts. She appeared at age 3 in the 1963 Robert Drew documentary Crisis: Behind a Presidential Commitment saying hello to U.S. Justice Department official Nicholas Katzenbach by phone from the office of her father, who was U.S. Attorney General at the time. Her father was assassinated in 1968. She is a graduate of The Putney School in Vermont and Brown University. She later received her Juris Doctor from Boston College Law School.

== Career ==
=== Human rights work ===
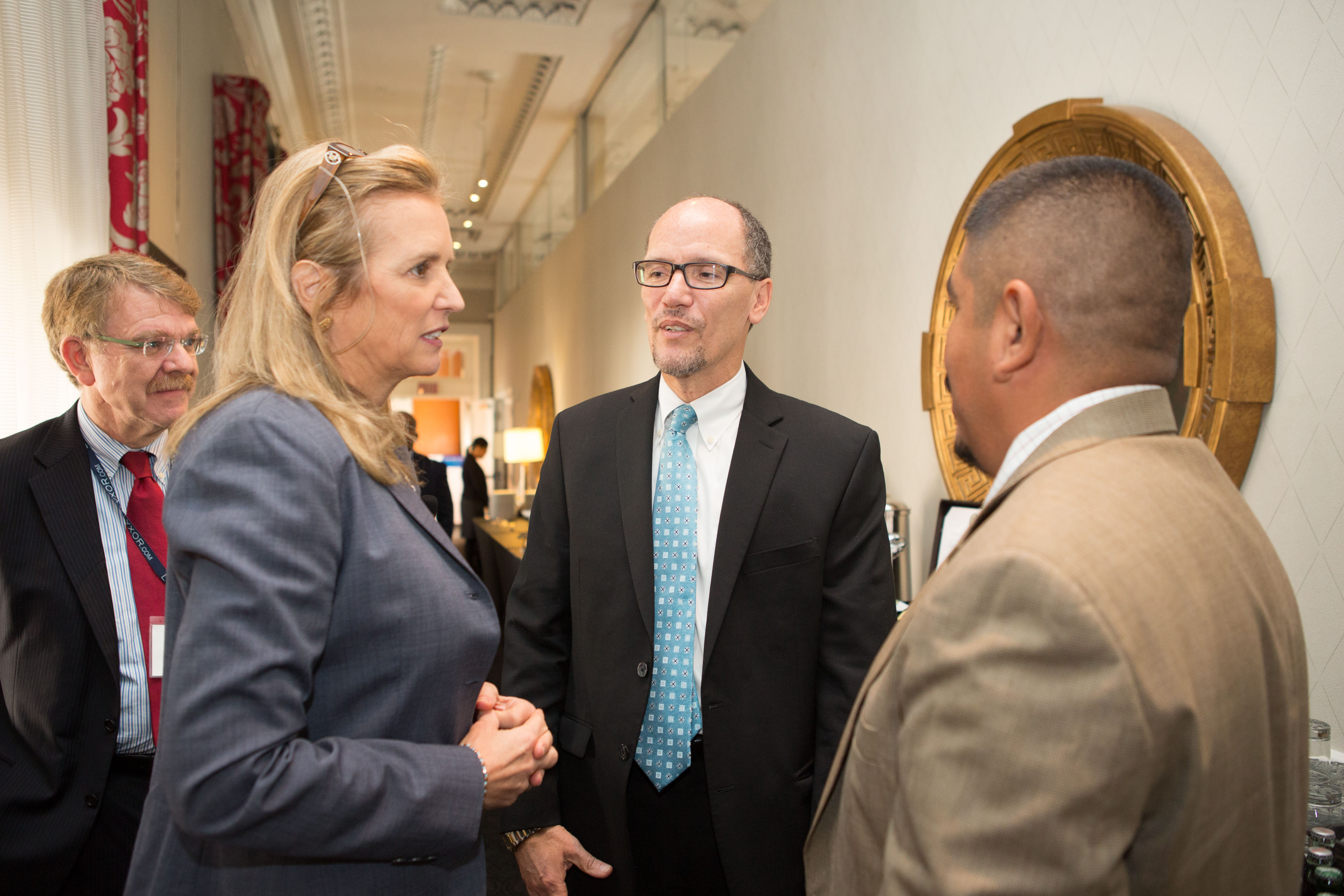
Kennedy in 2015 at the Robert F. Kennedy Human Rights Compass Conference

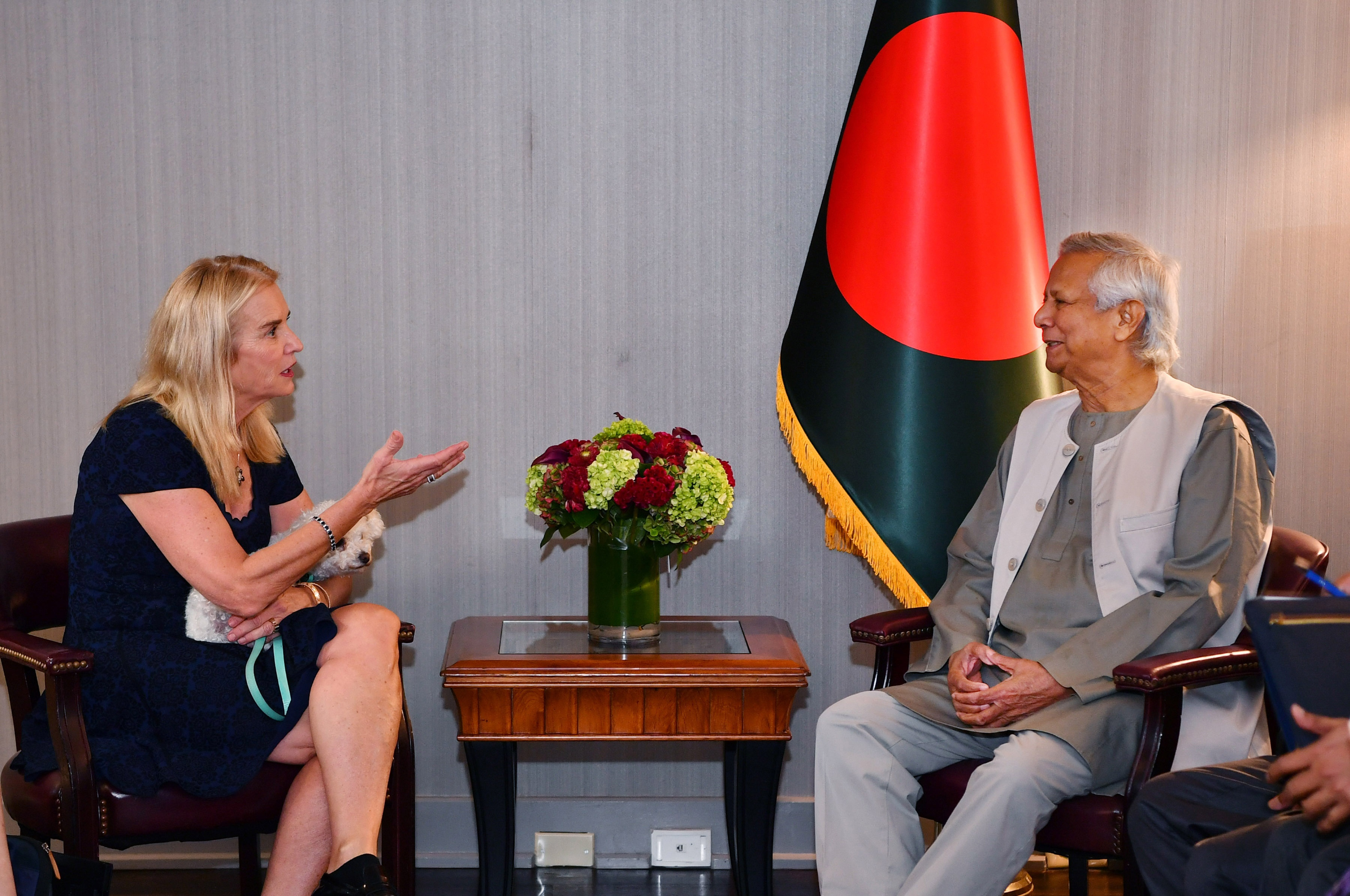
Muhammad Yunus And Kerry Kennedy Meeting At Hyatt Grand Central New York

Kennedy's life has been devoted to equal justice, to the promotion and protection of basic rights, and to the preservation of the rule of law. Kennedy is the president of Robert F. Kennedy Human Rights. She started working in the field of human rights in 1981 as an intern with Amnesty International, where she investigated abuses committed by U.S. immigration officials against refugees from the Salvadoran Civil War in El Salvador.

For over thirty years, she has worked on diverse human rights issues such as children's rights, child labor, disappearances, indigenous land rights, judicial independence, freedom of expression, ethnic violence, impunity, and the environment. She has concentrated specifically on women's rights, particularly honor killings, sexual slavery, domestic violence, workplace discrimination, and sexual assault. She has worked in over 60 countries and led hundreds of human rights delegations.

Kennedy established the RFK Center Partners for Human Rights in 1986 to ensure the protection of rights codified under the U.N. Declaration of Human Rights. RFK Partners provides support to human rights defenders around the world. The Center uncovers human rights abuses such as torture, repression of free speech and child labor; urges Congress and the U.S. administration to highlight human rights in foreign policy; and supplies activists with the resources they need to advance their work. Kennedy also founded RFK Compass, which works on sustainable investing with leaders in the financial community. She started the RFK Training Institute in Florence, Italy, which offers courses of study to leading human rights defenders across the globe.

Kennedy is Chair of the Amnesty International USA Leadership Council. Nominated by President George W. Bush and confirmed by the U.S. Senate, she is on the board of directors of the United States Institute of Peace, as well as Human Rights First, and Inter Press Service in Rome, Italy. She is a patron of the Bloody Sunday Trust (Northern Ireland) and serves on the Editorial Board of Advisors of the Buffalo Human Rights Law Review. She is on the Advisory Committee for the International Campaign for Tibet, the Committee on the Administration of Justice of Northern Ireland, the Global Youth Action Network, Studies without Borders and several other organizations. She serves on the leadership council of the Amnesty International Campaign to Stop Violence Against Women and on the Advisory Board of the Albert Schweitzer Institute and the National Underground Railroad Freedom Center's National Advisory Council.

Lawyers for Ecuadorean plaintiffs in the long-running lawsuit against Chevron Corporation for environmental and human health damages at the Lago Agrio oil field hired Kennedy to conduct public relations for their cause. She traveled to Ecuador in 2009, after which she blasted Chevron in an article for the Huffington Post. Neither her Huffington Post piece nor the news coverage of her advocacy disclosed that she was being paid by the plaintiffs, a fact not made public until 2012. The plaintiffs' lead American lawyer reportedly paid Kennedy $50,000 in February 2010, and the plaintiffs' law firm budgeted $10,000 per month for her services, plus $40,000 in expenses in June 2010. Kennedy was also reportedly given a 0.25 percent share of any money collected from Chevron, worth $40 million if the full amount were to be collected. Kennedy responded that she was "paid a modest fee for the time I spent on the case," but denied that she had any financial interest in the outcome.

=== Bail reform ===
Kennedy has criticized the treatment of New York teenager Kalief Browder during his extended time in pretrial detention at Rikers Island. This included video recordings of guards beating Browder, withholding food, and denying medical treatment. In 2016, Kennedy campaigned for adoption of S 5998-A/A 8296-A, referred to as "Kalief's Law," in the [New York State Legislature], which would have guaranteed speedy trials to defendants being held in pretrial detention. On June 9, 2016, the New York State Assembly passed Kalief's Law by a 138-2 margin. The law was not voted on by the New York State Senate in 2016, and has been reintroduced by State Senator Daniel L. Squadron during the 2017-2018 legislative session as S 1998-A.

Kennedy remains a major voice in the campaign for speedy trial reform in New York, writing in a 2017 New York Daily News editorial that "we make a mockery out of the promise" of a speedy trial. Kennedy has also worked closely with the Katal Center for Health, Equity and Justice to campaign for passage of speedy trial reform and criminal justice reform before the New York Assembly.

On June 21, 2017, Kennedy, through her organization, Robert F. Kennedy Human Rights, posted the $100,000 bail for Pedro Hernandez, a 17-year-old who had spent over a year in pretrial detention at Rikers Island in connection with a shooting investigation. Hernandez had become the face of bail reform following extensive reporting on his incarceration by Daily News columnist Shaun King.

Hernandez's bail had initially been set at over $250,000, but that sum was lowered to $100,000 after Robert F. Kennedy Human Rights argued such a high sum was disproportional. Less than a week after his release from Rikers Island, Bronx District Attorney Darcel D. Clark announced she would no longer pursue a case against Hernandez. On October 9, 2018, all remaining charges against Hernandez were dropped on the condition he attend college.

=== Break Bread, Not Families campaign ===
On June 21, 2018, in response to President Donald Trump's decision to enact a 'zero-tolerance' policy of family separation on immigrants entering the United States illegally, Kennedy joined organizations including the Dolores Huerta Foundation, the Texas Civil Rights Project and La Union Del Pueblo Entero to launch the 'Break Bread Not Families Immigration Fast and Prayer Chain. The campaign, which raised funds to support the reunification of immigrant families, argued Trump administration policy was "not only immoral, it is also illegal under U.S. and international law."

On June 23, 2018, the Break Bread Not Families campaign held a prayer vigil in the American border town of McAllen, Texas. The vigil marked the start of the campaign that encouraged activists, political figures and celebrities to fast for 24 hours before passing the fast to another public figure. Participants included former United States Secretary of Housing and Urban Development Julian Castro, United States Senator Ed Markey, Congresswomen Rosa DeLauro, Barbara Lee and Annie McLane Kuster, Congressman Joseph P. Kennedy III, and actors such as Aisha Tyler, Alfre Woodard, Julia Roberts, Lena Dunham, and Evan Rachel Wood.

Kennedy joined protestors outside the Ursula Detention Center, where they temporarily blocked a bus of immigrant children from departing. Kennedy was threatened with arrest by U.S. Customs and Border Protection agents after repeatedly attempting to speak with officials inside Ursula about the use of chain-link cages to house children separated from their families.

The next day, Kennedy and Dolores Huerta led a march and rally outside the federal immigration camp in Tornillo, Texas in solidarity with the then-2,400 child immigrants in facilities similar to Tornillo.

=== Being Catholic Now ===
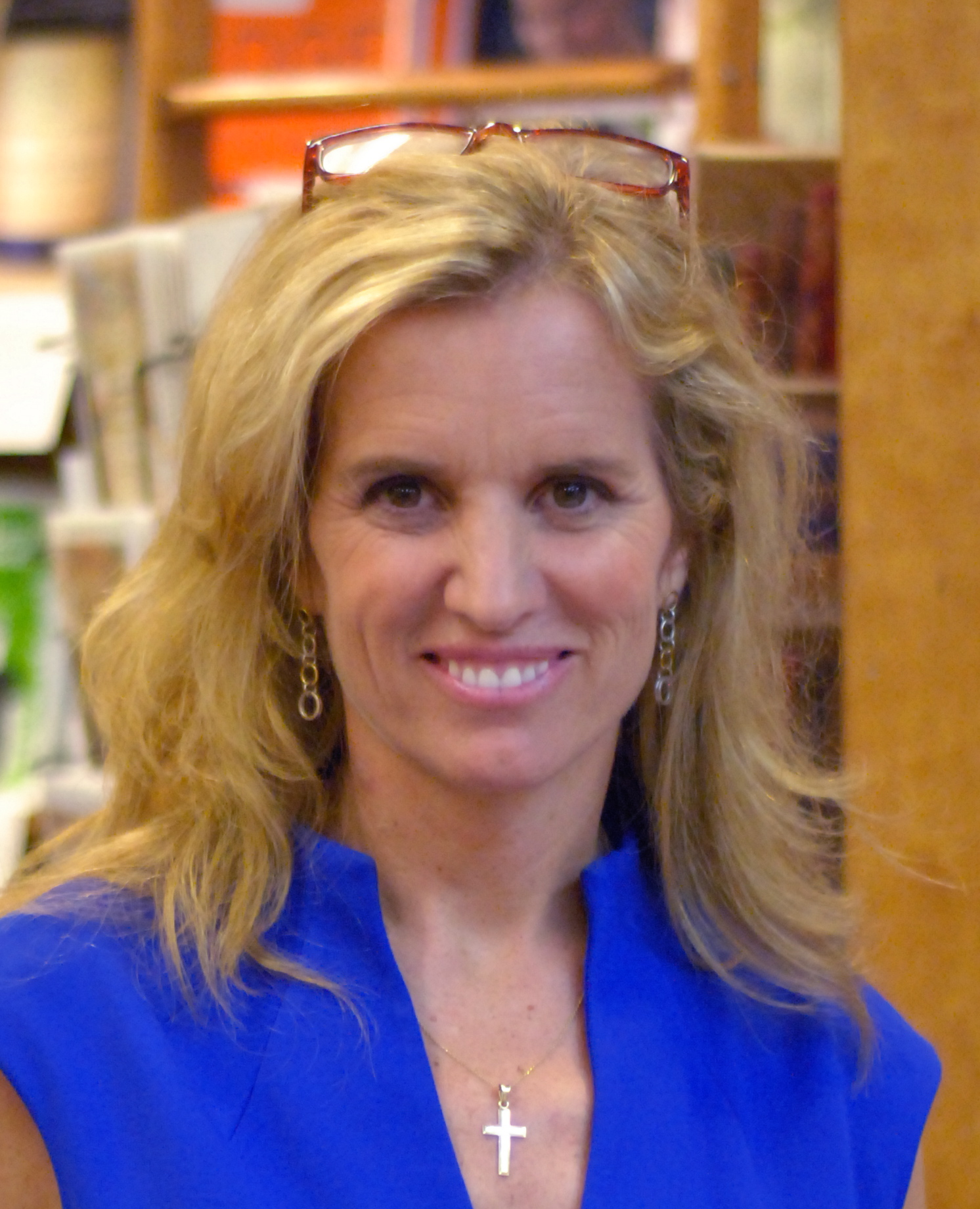
Kennedy in 2008 at Harvard Book Store

In 2008, Kennedy was the editor of Being Catholic Now, Prominent Americans talk about Change in the Church and the Quest for Meaning. The book included essays from prominent Catholics, including Nancy Pelosi, Cokie Roberts, now-former Cardinal McCarrick, Sister Joan Chittister, Tom Monaghan, Bill O'Reilly, Doris Kearns Goodwin, Doug Brinkley, and others.

=== Robert F. Kennedy: Ripples of Hope ===
In 2018, Kennedy published Robert F. Kennedy: Ripples of Hope: Kerry Kennedy in Conversation with Heads of State, Business Leaders, Influencers, and Activists about Her Father's Impact on Their Lives. The book contains interviews from prominent individuals whose lives and careers were influenced by the legacy of Robert F. Kennedy, and explores how Kennedy's legacy touched the fields of entertainment, politics, faith, and activism. Interviewees include Tony Bennett, Harry Belafonte, Bono, Barack Obama, John Lewis and activists including Gloria Steinem and Marian Wright Edelman.

== Honors ==
Kennedy holds honorary doctorates of law from Le Moyne College and University of San Francisco Law School, and of Humane Letters from Bay Path College and the Albany College of Pharmacy. She is also a member of the Massachusetts and District of Columbia bar associations.

Kennedy was named Woman of the Year 2001 by Save the Children, Humanitarian of the Year Award from the South Asian Media Awards Foundation, and the Prima Donna Award from Montalcino Vineyards. In 2008, she received the Eleanor Roosevelt Medal of Honor and the Thomas More Award from Boston College Law School. World Vision and International AIDS Trust gave her the 2009 Human Rights Award.

She has received awards from the Southern Christian Leadership Conference (for leadership in abolishing the death penalty), the American Jewish Congress of the Metropolitan Region, and the Institute for the Italian American experience three I's award for outstanding efforts and achievements for human rights.

Kennedy received the Gold Mercury International Award 2006 for her humanitarian efforts in a ceremony at the Victoria and Albert Museum in London.

In 2017, Kennedy received the Medal for Social Activism from the World Summit of Nobel Peace Laureates in Bogotá, Colombia for "her impactful efforts on communities throughout the world as a result of her life-long devotion to the pursuit of equal justice."

== Personal life ==
"When my brother David died, where's my Dad? When my brother Michael died, where's my dad? When I got married and I walked down that aisle alone."

— Kerry Kennedy talking about her father during her opposition to her father's assassin's release in a December 2021 interview with CBS.

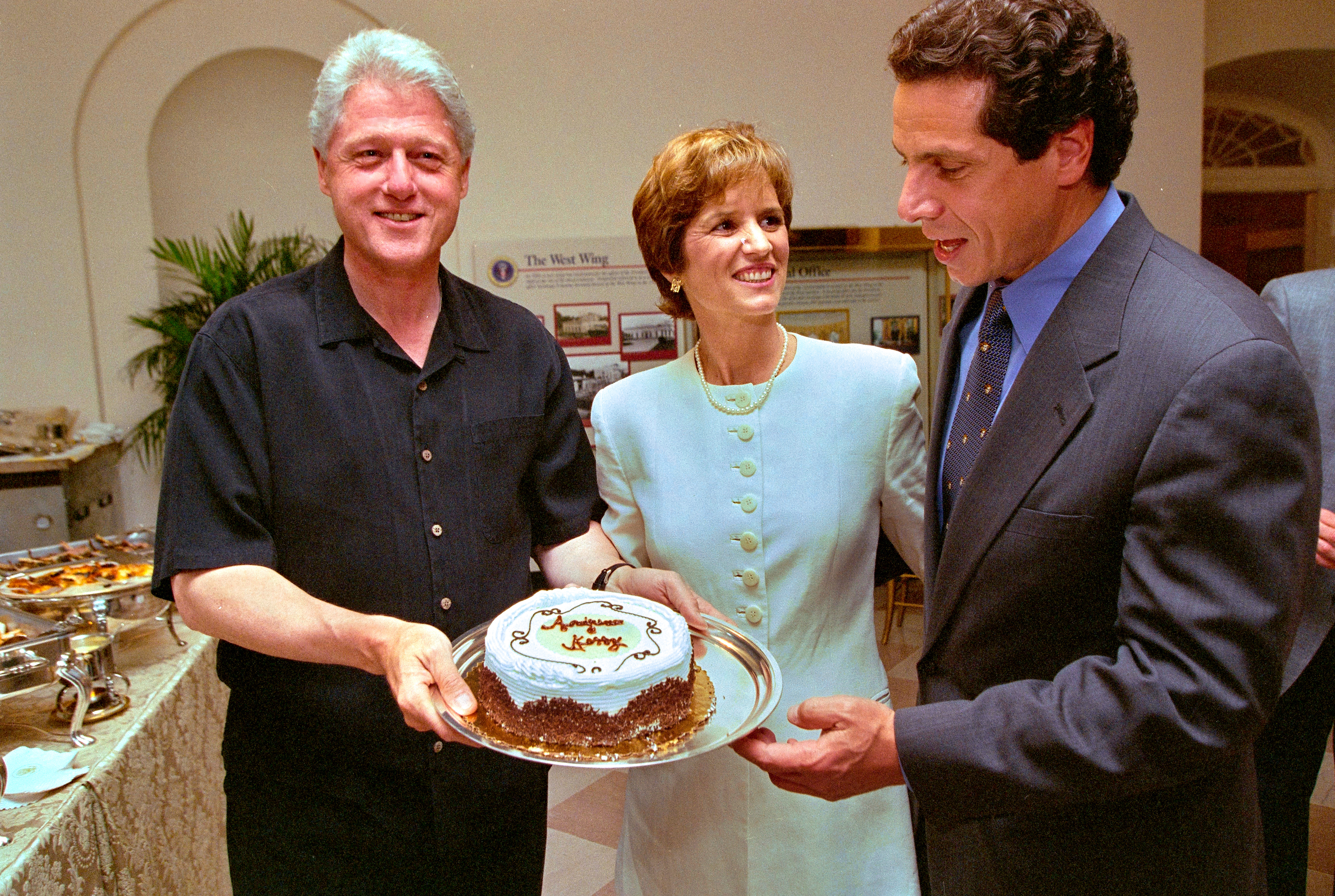
Bill Clinton alongside Kerry Kennedy and Andrew Cuomo at the White House, June 2000

On June 9, 1990, at age 30, she married Andrew Cuomo in the Cathedral of St. Matthew the Apostle in Washington, D.C.. She walked alone down the aisle, declining offers from several relatives (including one from her uncle Ted) to be walked down the aisle out of respect to her father. Their wedding was attended by Kennedy's friend Ghislaine Maxwell, a British socialite who was later arrested for aiding Jeffrey Epstein's child sex trafficking. Kennedy and Cuomo have three daughters: twins Cara Ethel Kennedy-Cuomo and Mariah Matilda Kennedy-Cuomo (b. 1995), and Michaela Andrea Kennedy-Cuomo (b. 1997). During her 15-year marriage to Cuomo, from 1990 to 2005, she was known as Kerry Kennedy-Cuomo. The couple separated in 2003, and divorced in 2005.

In July 2012, Kennedy allegedly sideswiped a tractor trailer on Interstate 684 in Westchester County. On the morning of July 13, 2012, Kennedy was found in her car. A police report said she had trouble speaking, was swaying and told an officer that she may have accidentally taken a sleeping pill earlier that day. In a court appearance on July 17, Kennedy said local hospital tests found no traces of drugs and that her doctor believed she had suffered a seizure. She pleaded not guilty to driving while impaired. A toxicology report filed on July 25 said zolpidem (also known as Ambien) was found in a sample of her blood taken when she was arrested, at which point Kennedy released a statement saying in part, "The results we received today from the Westchester County lab showed trace amounts of a sleep aid in my system, so it now appears that my first instinct was correct. I am deeply sorry to all those I endangered that day, and am enormously grateful for the support I have received over the past two weeks." Kennedy said she did not remember anything between entering a highway to go to a gym and when she found herself at a traffic light with a police officer at her door.

On January 23, 2014, Judge Robert Neary ruled that the drugged-driving case against Kennedy would move forward. On February 20, 2014, jury selection for her trial began. Kennedy was not present, and was instead in Brussels and the Western Sahara conducting human rights advocacy. Sixty-two people were interviewed for the six-person panel. Kennedy admitted to having been in a car wreck 18 months before the incident, in which she had suffered a head injury requiring anti-seziure medication. The jury acquitted Kennedy of the charges on February 28, 2014.

== Bibliography ==
- Speak Truth to Power: Human Rights Defenders Who Are Changing Our World (2000) ISBN 978-0812930627
- Being Catholic Now: Prominent Americans Talk About Change in the Church and the Quest for Meaning (edited by Kerry Kennedy) (2008) ISBN 978-0307346858
- Robert F. Kennedy: Ripples of Hope (2018) ISBN 978-1478918240
- Ethel Kennedy: The Extraordinary Life and Bold Legacy (2026) ISBN 978-0063454958
