= Nicolas De Santis =

Spanish-Italian entrepreneur (born 1966)

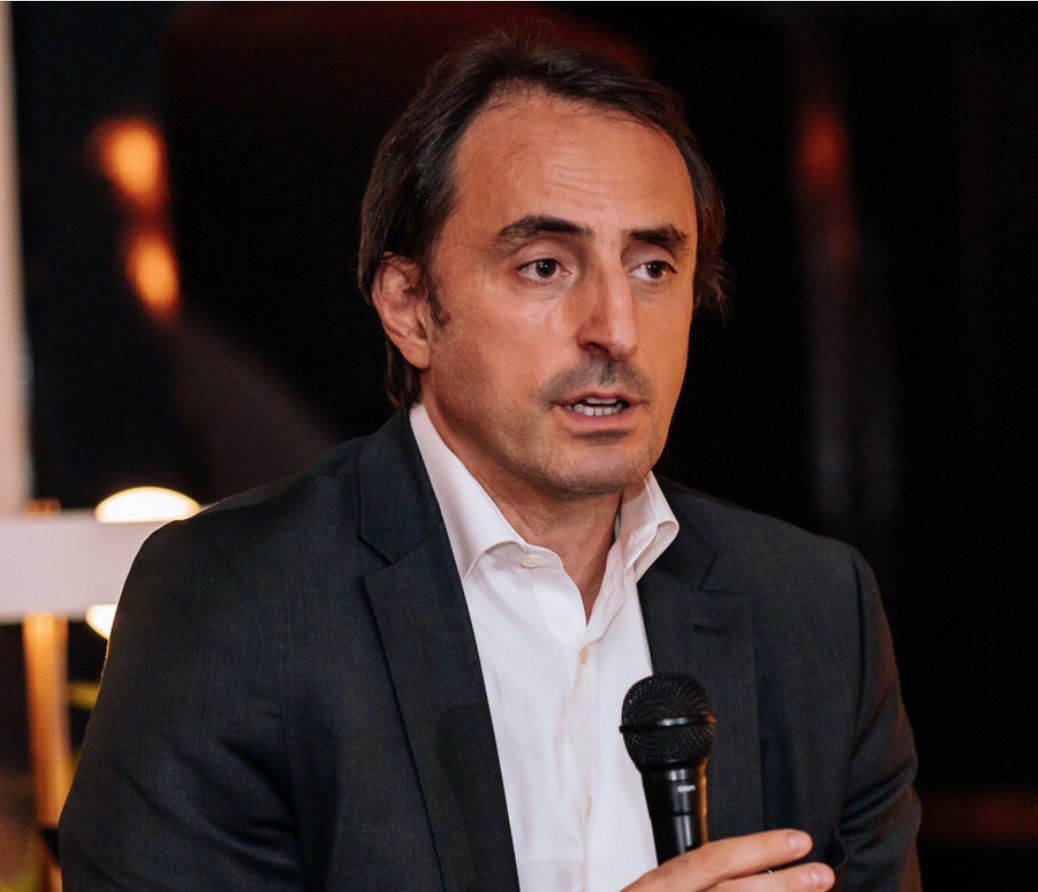
- De Santis in 2019
- Born: 1966 (age 59–60); Madrid, Spain
- Citizenship: Italian
- Occupation: Businessman
- Known for: Opodo and beenz.com
- Title: President of Gold Mercury International
- Spouse: Melissa Odabash
- Children: 2
- Parent(s): Eduardo De Santis and Maria Cuadra
- Website: www.nicolasdesantis.com

Nicolas De Santis (born 1966) is an Italian businessman. He launched the first digital currency of the web, beenz.com and co-founded travel portal opodo. In 2004 he became the president and secretary general of Gold Mercury International, a think tank and global governance award organisation founded in 1961 by his father.

== Early life and education ==
Nicolas De Santis was born in Madrid, Spain in 1966. He is the son of Spanish actress Maria Cuadra and film producer Eduardo De Santis. As a child actor, he appeared in the Spanish movie Elisita.

== Career ==
De Santis started his career at Landor Associates (now WPP Group) where his father was a partner. As a strategy advisor, Nicolas has created strategies and visions for governments, academic institutions, global brands, and technology start-ups, such as: British Airways, Opodo, Morgan Stanley, Iberdrola, Garanti Bank, Coca-Cola, PRISA and the European Union (see Captain Euro), among others.

=== Internet Entrepreneur ===
De Santis' first previous internet venture was beenz.com (the first virtual internet currency) where he was Chief Marketing Officer. De Santis invested in and joined Beenz in 1999 as one of the founding team members. De Santis helped to raise $100 million from investors including Carlo De Benedetti and François Pinault. Beenz was sold in 2001 to the US Carlson Marketing Group.

De Santis was recruited by Spencer Stuart from beenz.com in 2001 to start and launch Opodo, the European Online Travel Portal as its Chief Marketing Officer. Original co-founders were 9 European airlines including British Airways, Air France, Alitalia, Iberia, KLM, Lufthansa, Aer Lingus, Austrian Airlines and Finnair. Opodo was the European version of Orbitz, the American travel website owned by various American airlines. In 2008, Opodo's turnover reached €1.3 billion in gross sales.

=== Pro-EU work ===
In the 1990s, De Santis worked for the European Union under President Enrique Baron Crespo where he advised on issues relating to European identity and the launch of the Euro currency.

As part of the launch of the Euro currency he developed and launched Captain Euro, Europe's superhero, designed to analyse the perceptions and emotions of Europeans regarding federalism and European identity, and appeal to the people. It aimed to appeal to the European youth, and espouse the virtues of integration.

In 2013, De Santis launched the Brand EU Centre, an independent, pro-EU initiative to improve the management of the European Union brand. One of the main activities of the centre was to support the REMAIN campaign in the 2016 United Kingdom European Union membership referendum. The BRAND EU Centre was launched with the support of former European Parliament President Enrique Baron Crespo and American Investor Todd Ruppert.

== Board memberships ==
De Santis was a board member of Nasdaq-listed Lyris Technologies – a digital marketing & CRM analytic solutions company. Based in Silicon Valley, California, Lyris was acquired by Texas-based AUREA Software in 2015.

In January 2013, he joined the board of the Global Virus Network (GVN) where he is a senior advisor. De Santis believes that: "As our planet's population grows exponentially, GVN's role in tackling old and new viruses will become central in preventing, protecting and curing present and future generations."

In 2019, he joined the board of trustees of the World Law Foundation, an international organisation promoting peace and respect for the rule of law, associated with the World Jurist Association.

In 2021, he joined the board of directors of Nasdaq-listed Ferroglobe, a producer of silicon metal, silicon-based alloys and manganese-based specialty alloys.

== Personal life ==
He is married to the American swimsuit designer Melissa Odabash, and they have two teenage daughters.
