= Anthem of Europe =

European Anthem
- Official anthem of the Council of Europe and the European Union
- Music: Ludwig van Beethoven, 1824
- Adopted: CoE: 1972, EU: 1985

Audio sample
- "Ode to Joy" (instrumental): file; help

The European Anthem or Anthem of Europe, also known as Ode to Joy, is a piece of instrumental music adapted from the prelude of the final movement of Beethoven's 9th Symphony composed in 1823, originally set to words adapted from Friedrich Schiller's 1785 poem "Ode to Joy". In 1972, the Council of Europe adopted it as an anthem to represent Europe, and later in 1985 it was also adopted by the European Union.

Its purpose is to honour shared European values. The EU describes it as expressing the ideals of freedom, peace, and solidarity. The anthem is played on official occasions such as political or civil events.

"Ode to Joy" (instrumental, long version)

== History ==
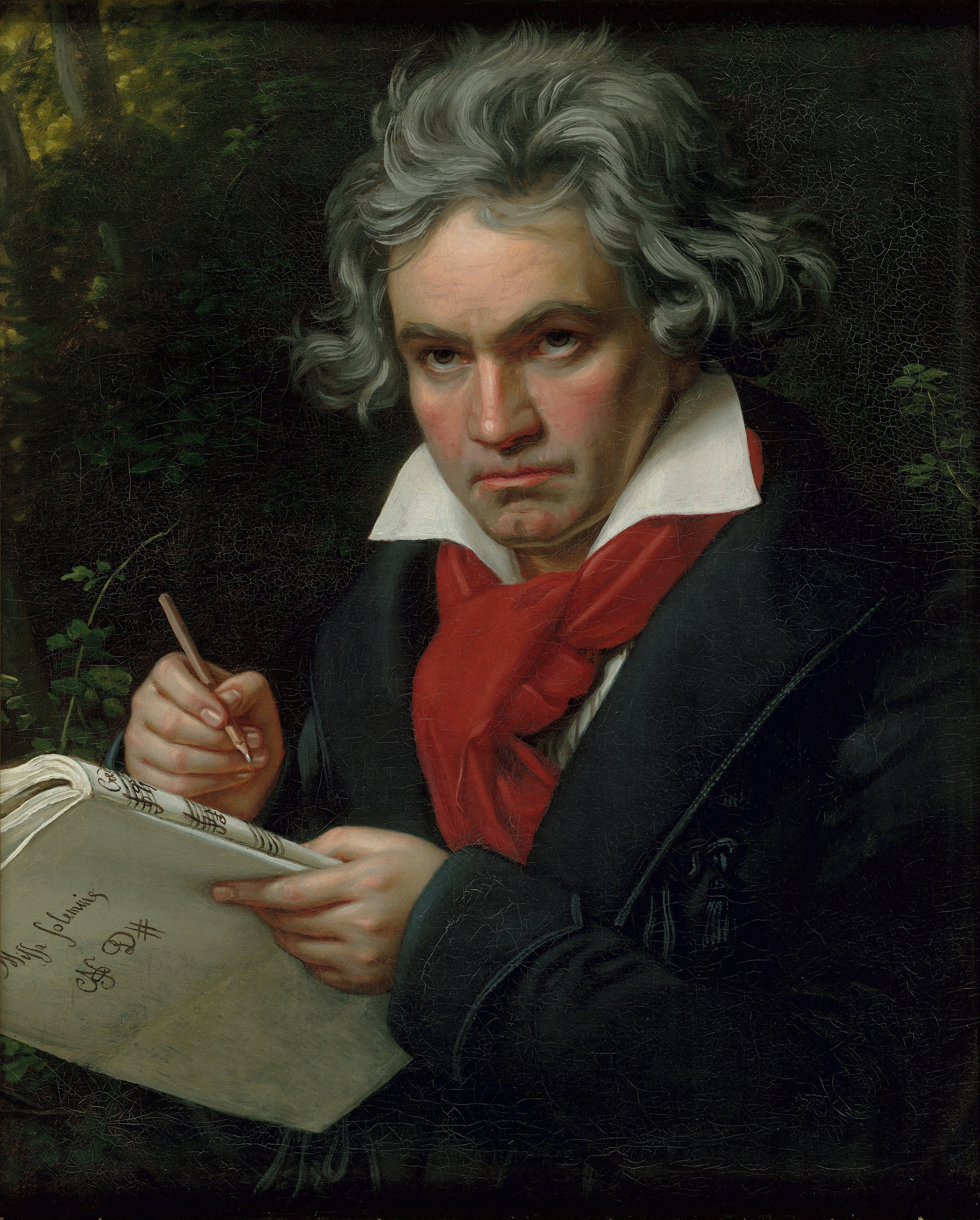
Composer Ludwig van Beethoven

Friedrich Schiller wrote the poem "An die Freude" (lit. 'To Joy') in 1785 as a "celebration of the brotherhood of man." In later life, the poet was contemptuous of this popularity and dismissed the poem as typical of "the bad taste of the age" in which it had been written. After Schiller's death, the poem provided the words for the choral movement of Ludwig van Beethoven's 9th Symphony.

In 1971 the Parliamentary Assembly of the Council of Europe decided to propose adopting the prelude to the "Ode to Joy" from Beethoven's 9th Symphony as the anthem, taking up a suggestion made by Richard von Coudenhove-Kalergi in 1955. Beethoven was generally seen as the natural choice for a European anthem. The Committee of Ministers of the Council of Europe officially announced the European Anthem on 19 January 1972 at Strasbourg: the prelude to "Ode to Joy", 4th movement of Ludwig van Beethoven's 9th symphony.

Conductor Herbert von Karajan was asked to write three instrumental arrangements – for solo piano, for wind instruments and for symphony orchestra and he conducted the performance used to make the official recording. Karajan decided on a decidedly slower tempo, using crotchet (quarter note) = 120 whereas Beethoven had written minim (half note) = 80.

The anthem was launched via a major information campaign on Europe Day in 1972 without a public holiday, since it is close to May Day. In 1985, it was adopted by EU heads of state and government as the official anthem of the then European Community (since 1993 the European Union). It is not intended to replace the national anthems of the member states but rather to celebrate the values they all share and their unity in diversity. It expresses the ideals of a united Europe: freedom, peace, and solidarity.

It was to have been included in the European Constitution along with the other European symbols; however, the treaty failed ratification and was replaced by the Treaty of Lisbon, which does not include any symbols. A declaration was attached to the treaty, in which sixteen member states formally recognised the proposed symbols. In response, the European Parliament decided that it would make greater use of the anthem, for example at official occasions. In October 2008, the Parliament changed its rules of procedure to have the anthem played at the opening of Parliament after elections and at formal sittings.

== Usage ==
"Ode to Joy" is the anthem of the Council of Europe and the European Union. In the context of the CoE, the anthem is used to represent all of Europe. In the context of the EU, the anthem is used to represent the union and its people. It is used on occasions such as Europe Day and formal events such as the signing of treaties. The European Parliament seeks to make greater use of the music; then-Parliament President Hans-Gert Pöttering stated he was moved when the anthem was played for him on his visit to Israel and that it ought to be used in Europe more often.

The German public radio station Deutschlandfunk has been broadcasting the anthem together with the Deutschlandlied shortly before midnight since New Year's Eve 2006. The two anthems were specially recorded by the Berlin Radio Symphony Orchestra in versions characterised by "modesty and intensity".

At the 2007 signing ceremony for the Treaty of Lisbon, the plenipotentiaries of the European Union's twenty-seven member states stood in attendance while the "Ode to Joy" was played and a choir of 26 Portuguese children sang the original German lyrics.

In 2008 it was used by Kosovo as its national anthem until it adopted its own, and it was played at its declaration of independence, as a nod to the EU's role in its independence from Serbia.

"Ode to Joy", automatically orchestrated in seven different styles, was used on 18 June 2015 during the ceremony celebrating the 5000th ERC grantee as anthem of the European Research Council to represent achievements of European research.

"Ode to Joy" is used as the theme song to the 2016 UEFA Euro qualifying and World Cup qualification since the European qualifying of the 2018 FIFA World Cup football competition at the introduction of every match.

In 2017, members of the Parliament of the United Kingdom from the Scottish National Party first whistled and then sang "Ode to Joy" during a vote at the House of Commons to protest against Brexit.

In 2018, the anthem of Japan and the anthem of the EU were performed in Tokyo during the official signing of the EU-Japan Economic Partnership Agreement. The European anthem is often played at the signing of official economic or political agreements with foreign governments.

In 2023, it was played after the Ukrainian anthem during President of Ukraine Volodymyr Zelenskyy's visit to the EU parliament.

== See also ==
- Anthems of international organizations
