= Eduardo De Santis =

Italian actor and businessman (1929–2019)

- Born: 7 September 1929; Positano, Italy
- Died: 25 March 2019 (aged 89)
- Occupations: Actor; businessman; philanthropist
- Known for: Founder Gold Mercury International Award
- Spouse: Maria Cuadra
- Children: 3 including Nicolas De Santis
- Awards: Commendatore Repubblica Italiana, Order of the Star of Italy

Eduardo De Santis (7 September 1929 – 25 March 2019) was an Italian actor, film producer, writer and philanthropist, best known as the founder and chairman of Gold Mercury International Award a think tank and global governance award organisation founded in 1961.

== Actor ==
Following a few initial jobs as a salesman in Italy, Eduardo De Santis, motivated by the glamour of Hollywood productions being shot in Rome in the 1940s and 1950s, decides to start a career as an actor. During that time he befriended many Hollywood stars that had fallen in love with Rome and were shooting in the 'Citta Eterna' (Eternal City) films like Quo Vadis? (1951), Three Coins in the Fountain (1954), Roman Holiday (1953), Spartacus (1960), Ben Hur (1959), and Cleopatra (1963). His first movie breakthrough was in 1953 in the film The Ship of Condemned Women, where he played the role of a sailor. He then went to act in ten more movies including Giuseppe Verdi (1953), Ho ritrovato mio figlio (1954) and Guai ai Vinti (1955).

== Career ==
In the late 1970s De Santis met brand and packaging design guru Walter Landor. Landor convinced De Santis to join his firm based in San Francisco California. He became a partner of the firm. De Santis helped internationalise the company and turn it into a global branding firm. Landor was sold to Young & Rubicam (now part of WPP plc) in 1991. Famous branding projects De Santis has worked on include the re-branding of Santander Bank, Iberia Airlines, Cepsa petroleum company, Iberdrola energy and savings bank 'la Caixa' in which the famous Catalan painter Joan Miró was engaged.

== Personal life ==
De Santis was born in Positano, Italy. Eduardo De Santis was married to Spanish actress Maria Cuadra. They met in the movie set of 'Le Belle dell'Aria' (Beauties of the Sky) a Spanish Italian co-production of 1957 where both played roles as actors. They have three children but were divorced. Eduardo De Santis was a close friend of Ettore Scola, Italian film director and his brother Pietro Scola. De Santis died in Madrid on 25 March 2019, due to complications caused by Acute myeloid leukemia.

== Awards ==
De Santis was a Commander of the Italian Republic and the Ordine della Stella d'Italia – OSI (Order of the Italian Star).
