= Symbols of Europe =

A number of symbols of Europe have emerged since antiquity, notably the mythological figure of Europa.

Several symbols were introduced in the 1950s and 1960s by the European Council. The European Communities created additional symbols for itself in 1985, which was to become inherited by the European Union (EU) in 1993. Such symbols of the European Union now represent political positions in support of EU policies and European integration as advocated by Europeans.

== Europa and the bull ==
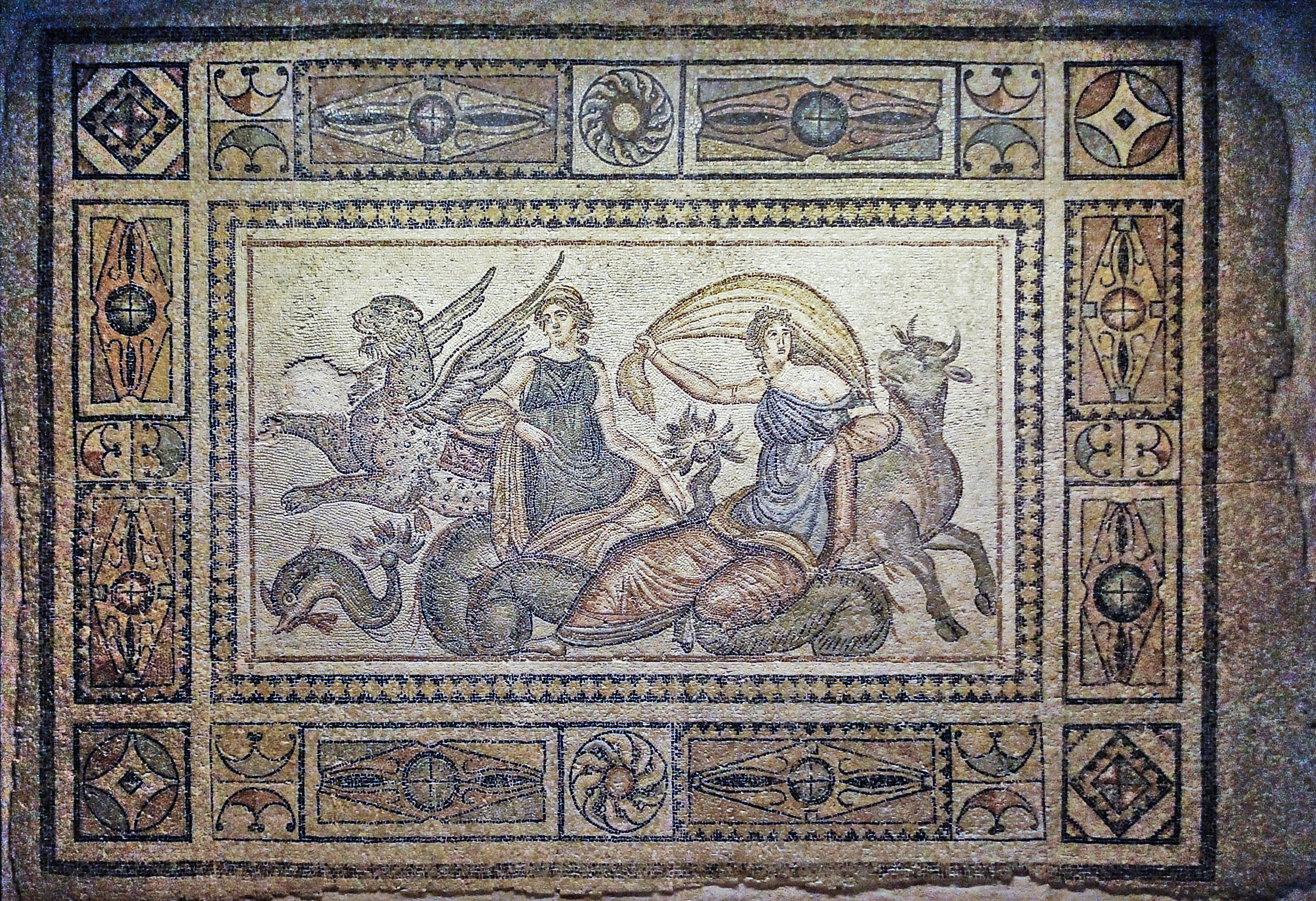
Europa velificans, "her fluttering tunic… in the breeze" (mosaic, Zeugma Mosaic Museum)

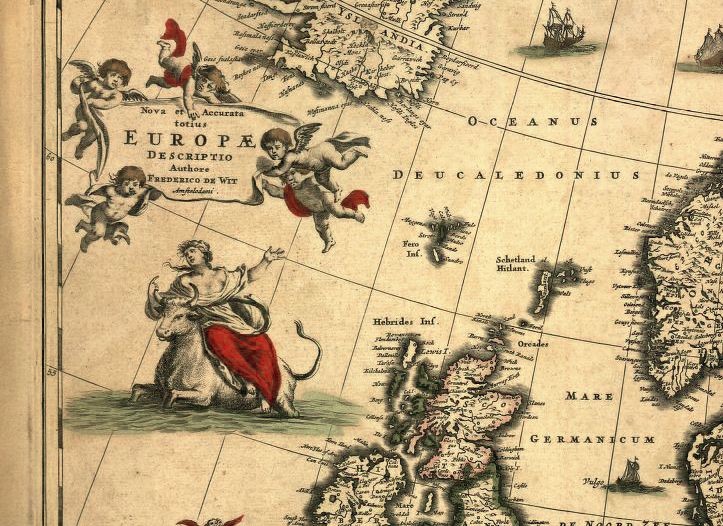
Europa as a representation of Europe (Nova et accurata totius Europæ descriptio by Fredericus de Wit, 1700)

Symbol displayed on all EU and residence permits

Europa was used as a geographical term, for one of the great divisions of the known world, by Herodotus (in a reduced geographical scope, referring to parts of Thrace or Epirus, also in the Homeric hymn to Apollo). It became the geographical term for the landmass west of the Tanais in the Roman-era geography by Strabo and Ptolemy. Europa first began to be used in a cultural sense, denoting the territory of Latin Christendom, in the Carolingian period.

Europa is a feminine name, the name of a nymph in Hesiod, and in a legend first related by Herodotus, the name of a Phoenician noble-woman abducted by Greeks (in Herodotus' opinion, Cretans). The classical legend of Europa being abducted not by Greek pirates but by Zeus in the shape of a bull is told in Ovid's Metamorphoses. According to the account, Zeus took the guise of a tame white bull and mixed himself with the herds of Europa's father. While Europa and her female attendants were gathering flowers, she saw the bull, and got onto his back. Zeus took that opportunity and ran to the sea and swam, with her on his back, to the island of Crete. There he revealed his true identity, and Europa became the first queen of Crete. Zeus gave her a necklace made by Hephaestus and three additional gifts: Talos, Laelaps and a javelin that never missed. Zeus later re-created the shape of the white bull in the stars, which is now known as the constellation Taurus.

In addition to generally being a frequent motif in European art since Greco-Roman times, the founding myth of Europa and the bull has frequently been alluded to in relation to the continent and by the modern European Union, and can thus be considered not only a piece of toponymy, but also as a symbol, or national personification of Europe. For instance, statues of Europa and the bull are located outside several of the European Union's institutions, as well as on the Greek €2 coin. Europa's name appeared on postage stamps commemorating the Council of Europe, which were first issued in 1956. Furthermore, the dome of the European Parliament's Paul-Henri Spaak building contains a large mosaic by Aligi Sassu portraying the abduction of Europa with other elements of Greek mythology. The bull is also in the top-left corner of the new design of the residence permit card of all European Union countries.

== Europa regina ==
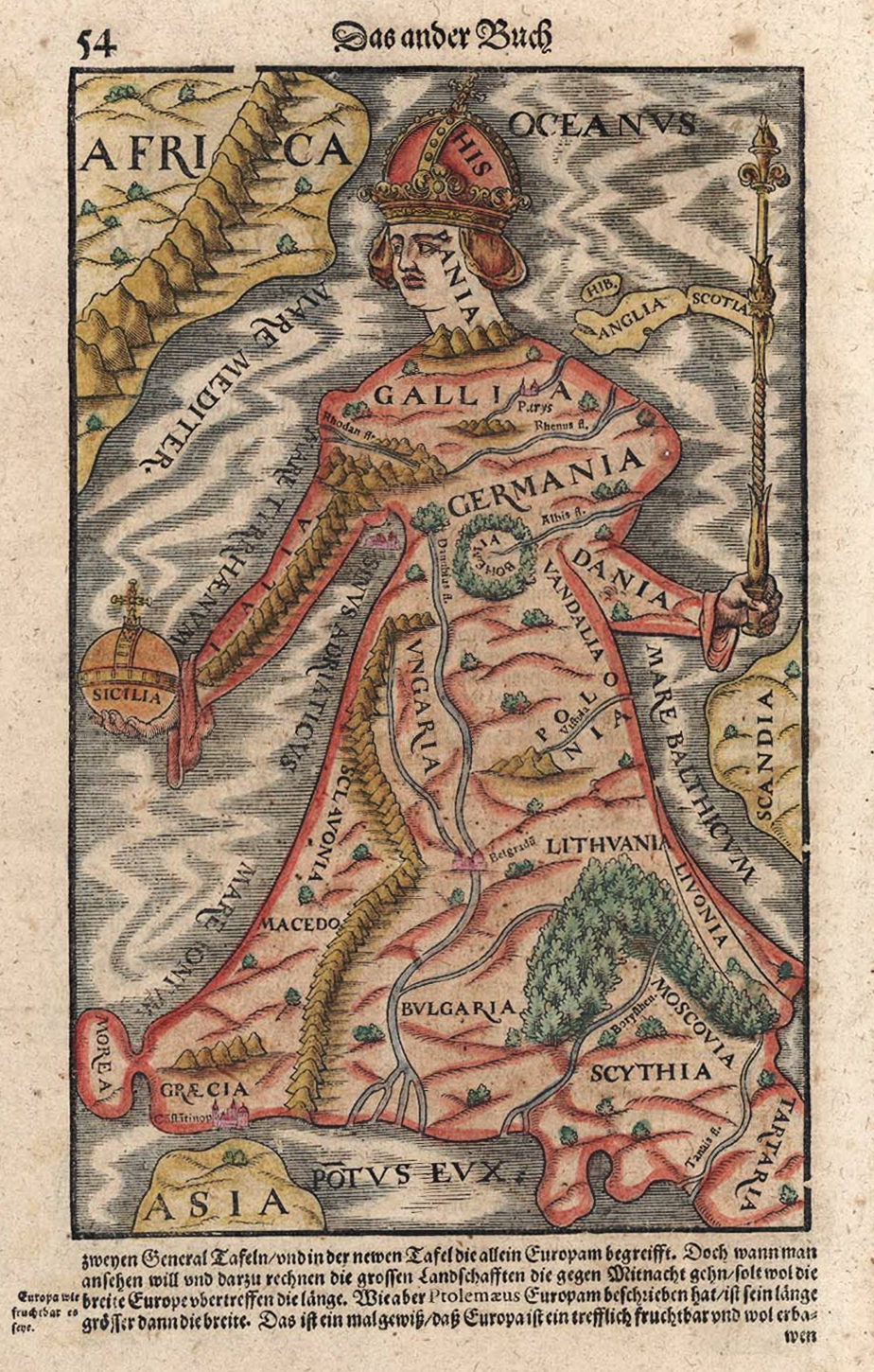
Europa regina in Sebastian Münster's "Cosmographia".

Europa regina (Latin for Queen Europe) is the cartographic depiction of the European continent as a queen. Introduced and made popular during the mannerist period, Europa Regina is the map-like depiction of the European continent as a queen. Made popular in the 16th century, the map shows Europe as a young and graceful woman wearing imperial regalia. The Iberian Peninsula (Hispania) is the head, wearing a crown shaped like the Carolingian hoop crown. The Pyrenees, forming the neck, separate the Iberian Peninsula from France (Gallia), which makes up the upper chest. The Holy Roman Empire (Germania and other territories) is the centre of the torso, with Bohemia (sometimes Austria in early depictions) being the heart of the woman (alternatively described as a medallion at her waist). Her long gown stretches to Hungary, Poland, Lithuania, Livonia, Bulgaria, Muscovy, Macedonia and Greece. In her arms, formed by Italy and Denmark, she holds a sceptre and an orb (Sicily). In most depictions, Africa, Asia and the Scandinavian peninsula are partially shown, as are the British Isles, in schematic form.

The first map to depict Europe in this manner was made by Johannes Bucius Aenicola (1516–1542) in 1537. Though much about the origination and initial perception of this map is uncertain, it is known that Putsch maintained close relations with Holy Roman Emperor Ferdinand I of Habsburg, and that the map's popularity increased significantly during the second half of the 16th century. Europa Regina was introduced in the 1530s by the Austrian cartographer Johannes Putsch, possibly with the intent of depicting Europe as the spouse of Charles V of Habsburg, who aspired to become the universal monarch of Christendom and reigned over numerous realms including the Holy Roman Empire, Austrian lands, Burgundian territories, and the kingdom of Spain. Arguments in favour of this hypothesis are the westward orientation of the map to have Hispania as the crowned head, said to resemble the face of Charles V's wife, Isabella of Portugal; the use of the Holy Roman Empire's insignia – its Carolingian crown, sceptre and orb – and the portrayal of Habsburg realms (Austria, Bohemia, Hungary, Germany) as the heart and centre of the body; the design of the gown, which resembles the contemporary dress code at the Habsburg court. As in contemporary portraits of couples, Europa regina has her head turned to her right and also holds the orb with her right hand, which has been interpreted as facing and offering power to her imaginary husband, the emperor. More general, Europe is shown as the res publica christiana, the united Christendom in medieval tradition, and great or even dominant power in the world.

Another allegory is the attribution of Europe as the paradise by special placement of the water bodies. As contemporary iconography depicted the paradise as a closed form, Europa regina is enclosed by seas and rivers. The Danube river is depicted in a way that it resembles the course of the biblical river flowing through the paradise, with its estuary formed by four arms. That Europa regina is surrounded by water is also an allusion to the mythological Europa, who was abducted by Zeus and carried over the water. Europa regina belongs to the Early Modern allegory of Europa triumphans, as opposed to Europa deplorans.

== Pater Europae ==
Charlemagne (Latin: Carolus Magnus; King of the Franks from 768; Holy Roman Emperor c. 742 – 814), also known as Charles the Great, is considered the founder of the French and German monarchies. Known as Pater Europae («Father of Europe»), he established an empire that represented the most expansive European unification since the fall of the Western Roman Empire and brought about a renaissance that formed a pan-European identity whilst marking the end of Late Antiquity. There was also a contemporary intellectual and cultural revival which profoundly marked the history of Western Europe. This gave Charlemagne a legendary standing that transcended his military accomplishments.

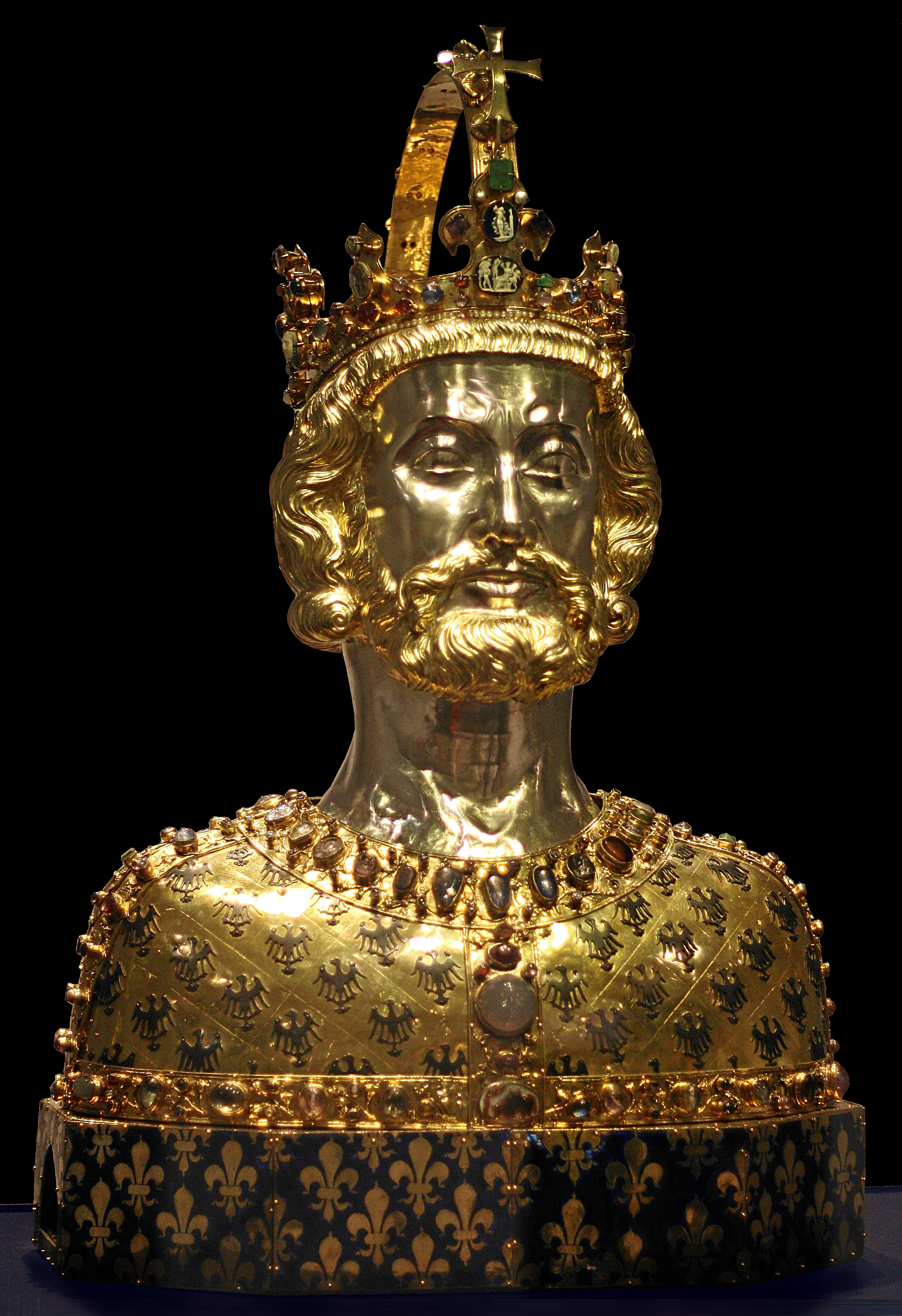
Reliquary, golden bust of Charlemagne wearing the Imperial Crown of the Holy Roman Empire in Aachen Cathedral, with the German reichsadler embossed on the metal and the French fleur-de-lis embroidered on the fabric

For many centuries, European royal houses sought to associate themselves with the Carolingian heritage. The crowns of the Holy Roman Empire and Napoleon Bonaparte were for instance both respectively named "The Crown of Charlemagne", and Charlemagne's personal sword, Joyeuse, served as a coronation sword for French kings from the 11th century onwards. The cult of Charlemagne was further embellished by the French renaissance author Jean Lemaire de Belges, who postulated that the emperor was part of an illustrious translatio imperii originating with King Priam of Troy during the Trojan Wars, and thus by extension Zeus, the "Father of Gods and men" in Greek Mythology.

Today, much of the pan-European, symbolic value of Charlemagne is attributed to the fact that he is considered an embodiment of the Franco-German friendship which was absent during the long-lasting enmity which culminated in the two world wars, but has become indispensable in the process of European integration. Thus, in the 1952 design competition for the Council of Europe's flag, several of the unsuccessful proposals were redolent of the Oriflamme; the banner given to Charlemagne by Pope Leo III at his coronation in the St. Peter's Basilica in the year 800. Similarities between Charlemagne's empire and the modern European integration were also suggested by professor Hans von Hentig the same year. The European Commission is also alluding to Charlemagne by means of naming one of its central buildings in Brussels after him (The Charlemagne building). The German city of Aachen has since 1949 annually awarded the Charlemagne Prize to champions of European unity, including Alcide De Gasperi, Jean Monnet and the euro itself. Each edition of the international affairs newspaper The Economist features a column called «Charlemagne's notebook», focusing on European Union affairs. In his speech at the award ceremony for the 2010 Charlemagne Youth Prize, European Parliament President Jerzy Buzek said the following:

Imagine, if you will, the age of Charlemagne, twelve hundred years ago. Already then, he had a vision of a united Europe. Just think how many wars there have been since then and how much European blood has been spilled. We were devoured by hatred. We were in the grip of our emotions. We were unable to think in common. People had a vision of a united Europe then, but did not achieve it. We must remember, my dear young friends, always to keep this vision in mind.

Later monarchs who also have carried sobriquets as "relatives" of Europe include Queen Victoria of the United Kingdom (grandmother of Europe), Christian IX of Denmark and Nicholas I of Montenegro (both respectively father-in-law of Europe). These late 19th and early 20th century sobriquets are however purely on account of the marriage of these monarchs' offspring to foreign princes and princesses, and involve no wider symbolism.

== Patron saints ==
The Roman Catholic Church venerates six saints as "patrons of Europe". Benedict of Nursia had been declared "Patron saint of all Europe" by Pope Paul VI in 1964. Pope John Paul II named between 1980 and 1999 Ss. Cyril and Methodius, Bridget of Sweden, Catherine of Siena and Teresa Benedicta of the Cross as further patrons.

== Flag ==
Flag of Europe

A "Flag of Europe" was introduced by the Council of Europe in 1955, originally intended as a "symbol for the whole of Europe", but due to its adoption by the European Economic Community (EEC) in 1985, and hence by the European Union (EU) as the successor organisation of the EEC, the flag is now strongly associated with the European Union. The flag has notably been used by pro-EU protestors in the colour revolutions of the 2000s, e.g., in Belarus in 2004 by the pro-EU faction in the Euromaidan riots in Ukraine in 2013, and by the pro-EU faction in the Brexit campaigns of 2016.

=== Pan-European flags adopted before 1955 ===
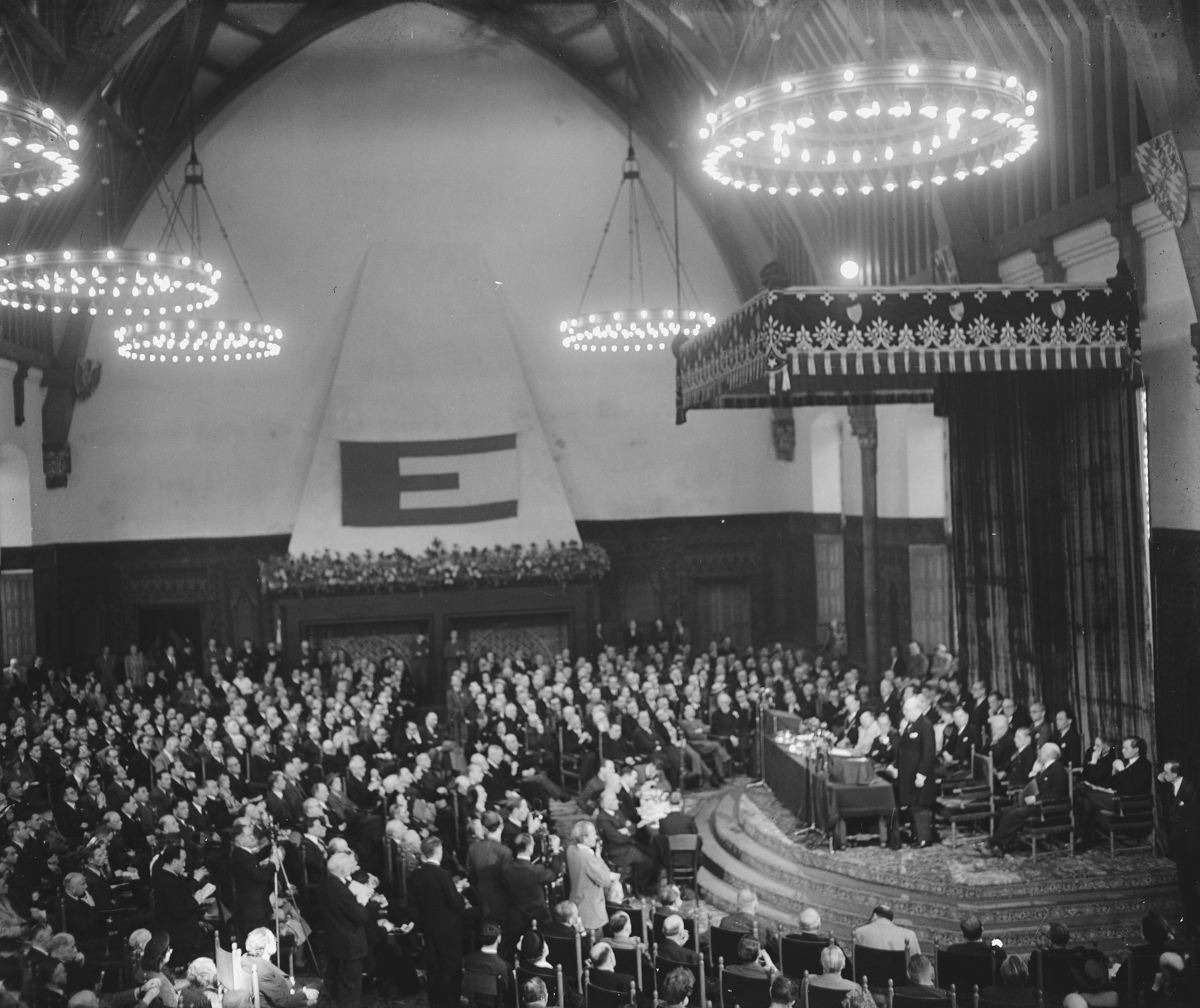
Federalist flag displayed at the 1948 Congress of Europe in the Hall of Knights in The Hague

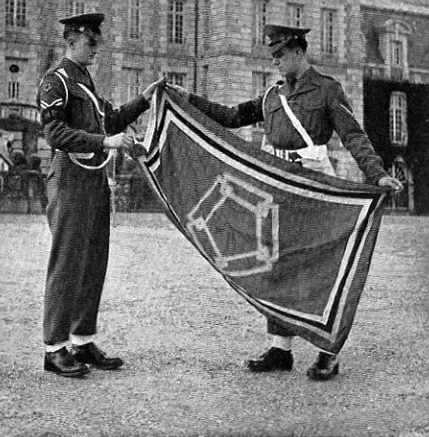
Western Union Standard displayed in 1949

Prior to development of political institutions, flags representing Europe were limited to unification movements. The most popular were the European Movement's large green 'E' on a white background, and the "Pan European flag" of the Paneuropean Union (1922).

The original flag of the Paneuropean Union (1922)

The original Federalist flag of the European Movement

Flag of the Western Union (1949–1954)

== See also ==
- Brand EU
- Captain Euro
- CE marking
- Charlemagne Prize
- Estimated sign
- Father-in-law of Europe
- Founding fathers of the European Union
