= Brand EU =

Private pro-EU organization

The Brand EU Centre (in short, Brand EU) is a pro-EU research and communications centre created and run by think tank Gold Mercury International and CorporateVision.io a strategy consulting firm, both located in London, England, United Kingdom. Its function is to "improve the management of the European Union brand". The Brand EU Centre was founded in 2014, and is run by Nicolas De Santis, President and Secretary General of Gold Mercury, and Enrique Barón Crespo, former President of the European Parliament.

The Brand EU Centre is based in London, in Gold Mercury House, Mayfair, and is funded privately. As an independent centre it is not funded or affiliated with any EU institutions or governmental bodies, nor is it connected to any political parties.

== Objectives ==
The centre's main goal is to improve citizens' understanding and connection to the European Union. The Centre asserts that member states' national governments, and Brussels itself has largely been ineffective at creating a strong EU brand identity among their citizens, and have not done a good job of promoting the EU's work. The centre's approach argues that connection with the Union has mostly been top down and must also include a bottom-up approach, stating with its citizens and civil society. Centre President, Nicolas De Santis believes that politicians do not help the EU's case, because they scapegoat it for their domestic problems, and claim the Union's successes as their own.

The Centre therefore aims to promote awareness among European citizens about the benefits which the European Union brings to their everyday lives.

== Treating the EU as a brand ==
The Brand EU Centre's mission is to treat the European Union and its identity as a "brand", which has to be marketed and understood clearly by its consumers (European citizens). The Centre asserts that while, over the past 50 years, Europe has been coming together via closer integration, most of the changes have been made at a political level; and the citizens have not properly connected or identified with the project as a result. The underlying concept is that the collective identity of citizens within the EU, and the values which Europeans adhere and aspire to, constitute a powerful "brand identity," which is extremely meaningful and valuable.

This refers to values such as peace, democracy, the rule of law, equality, and freedom, among others. The Brand EU Centre argues that while this brand is extremely powerful and valuable, it is not being marketed effectively by official European institutions, causing disenfranchisement and Euroscepticism to become the popular climate.

The Brand EU Centre also use publications, campaigns and events to address another "failure" of the European Union, namely its institutional complexity, which results in citizens' lack of understanding about its operations and democratic legitimacy.
