= Captain Euro =

Comics character

Captain Euro Adam Andros

Publication information
- Publisher: Twelve Stars, DESANTIX
- First appearance: The Adventures of Captain Euro (December 1998)
- Created by: Nicolas De Santis

In-story information
- Full name: Adam Andros
- Species: Super Skilled Human
- Place of origin: Atomium, Brussels
- Team affiliations: Twelve Stars Organisation
- Notable aliases: El Capitan, Captain Europe
- Abilities: Polyglot, diplomat, technoscientist

Captain Euro is a comic book superhero, created in 1999 as a way to promote the European Union, and specifically the launch of the Euro, the single European currency that arrived in 2002. The character has been featured on a website (first at captaineuro.com, later at captaineuro.eu) since 1999. Captain Euro has been featured on comic books and comic strips available on its website and as comic books on Amazon. The website's contents are available only in English.

Captain Euro, the campaign, website and all the additional characters and storylines were created by Nicolas De Santis of the consulting firm Twelve Stars for the EU. Twelve Stars was already working for the EU in various identity and brand projects, including with the European Parliament.

The Captain Euro character dresses in a costume which features elements of the flag of Europe, including the twelve stars motif. Elements of the character are clearly reminiscent of Marvel Comics' Captain America (the similar "Captain" moniker and patriotic costume).

In November 2014, De Santis relaunched the Captain Euro website, this time as an independent project not under EU supervision. The relaunch included some changes to the characters, as well as a significant change in tone: the stories became more humorous and more overtly political, with Captain Euro explaining and justifying the European Union to various real-life world leaders.

== Fictional character biography ==
Captain Euro (real name Adam Andros) is the main character, of unspecified nationality. Originally, he was described as the son of "a famous European Ambassador", a professor of palaeontology and a polyglot; after a motor accident one of his knees was replaced with a metal alloy joint, but he is otherwise "in peak physical condition". After the 2014 relaunch, Captain Euro became a former "investigative journalist and a writer with a deep interest in international affairs, social psychology and identity", who "discovered his deep passion for keeping Europe together while reporting on the horrific events of the Yugoslav wars". In 2016, his identity was changed again, to "a young internet cyber software and virtual reality (VR) genius and millionaire."

He runs the Twelve Stars Organisation, a group which seeks to "defend the security of Europe and uphold the values of the Union".

His team-mates include his sidekick Europa (real name Donna Eden), an environmentalist and archaeologist, and assistants Erik, Helen, Marcus, Lupo the timber wolf, and the computer system Pythagoras I.

The website claims that "they are the new ambassadors of global peace bearing the European message with them wherever they go." They also apparently represent Europe at sporting events, "competing in a number of championships and triumphing in the name of Europe."

The major foe of the organisation is Dr. D. Vider. D. Vider's full name was originally David Viderius, but after the relaunch it became Dexter Viderius. He was originally a "ruthless speculator" and "former financier" who hopes to divide the European Union so that he can more easily conquer it. After the 2014 relaunch, he became the head of Dividex, an evil multinational corporation. In 2016, he was changed again to become the head of VIPERA, a crime syndicate.

== Reception ==
Captain Euro received large coverage from the Global Media.

Robert Frank, in a 1998 article in The Wall Street Journal that appeared on the cover of the newspaper's global edition, wrote "Captain Euro is the ultimate youth-marketer. He was born out of the bureaucracy of Brussels: Mr. De Santis spent more than a year studying the European "identity" for the European Parliament only to determine "there is none." So, he proposed creating a "European character" or mascot. Parliament debated the issue for months but couldn't make a decision. Eventually, Mr. De Santis gave up and decided to create it himself."

Dan Glaister of The Guardian mocked the character upon its release in 1999, writing that Captain Euro has "the sort of history only a marketing company besieged by focus groups could devise." Quoting from the character's description that "participation in an experimental language programme enabled Adam to become a polyglot", Glaister dryly remarked, "Ah – so that's how to become a good European."

Eurosceptic politician and commentator Daniel Hannan, writing in 2011, criticised the Captain Euro literature as possibly "sinister". He described the Dr. D. Vider character as having "a hooked nose and a goatee beard, like some anti-Semitic caricature from the Völkischer Beobachter", and stated that D. Vider's real first name, David, and his occupation in finance could also be considered indicators that the villain is meant to be Jewish. Hannan also criticised the general concept of using comic-book characters to promote the EU, writing, "The notion that the government should get at parents through their children is a characteristic of authoritarian states, not liberal democracies."

András Simonyi and Amanda Norris, in a 2013 column in the Huffington Post, shared the opinion that Dr. D. Vider had "a clear anti-Semitic undertone", and added that his team of henchmen, "social misfits belonging to the 'Global Touring Circus,'" were themselves an offensive stereotype against the Romani of Europe. They also criticised Captain Euro's "meek and boring" nature (he does not use weapons), calling it emblematic of the European Union's reliance on "soft power" and its failure to solve its economic problems during the intervening years.

== Relaunch and subsequent reception ==
In 2014, Captain Euro was relaunched with a new website, featuring satirical comic strips, vignettes and radio podcasts with global heads of state, including: then UK Prime Minister David Cameron, Russian President Vladimir Putin, American President Barack Obama, German Chancellor Angela Merkel and Italian Prime Minister Matteo Renzi. The new website also included modified description of the characters of the Captain Euro Team and their villains.

The new website has received extensive media coverage in the UK and Europe. A number of British journalists humorously insinuated that the relaunch was done to combat the threat of the Eurosceptic UK Independence Party (UKIP): Matthew Champion of The Independent compared the appearance of Dr. D. Vider to the UKIP's leader Nigel Farage, while Catherine Mayer of Time magazine called D. Vider's crew "evil-minded euroskeptics dressed in UKIP purple". Conversely, Gus Bentley of City A.M., discussing a strip in which Captain Euro convinces David Cameron of the importance of the EU, stated wryly that it "could be mistaken for the latest Ukip leaflet". Pablo Guimón of Spanish newspaper El País wrote: "Hit by the crisis of the monetary union...challenged by the promise of a referendum of the separation of the UK, The European project seems to cry out for the help of a superhero. Fear not: here it is!".

David Böcking of Germany's Der Spiegel wrote: "Captain Euro, hero of the single currency and the single market. The revitalized cartoon character fights against the crisis – without authority from Brussels."
