= Enrique Barón =

Spanish politician, economist, and lawyer (born 1944)

Enrique Barόn
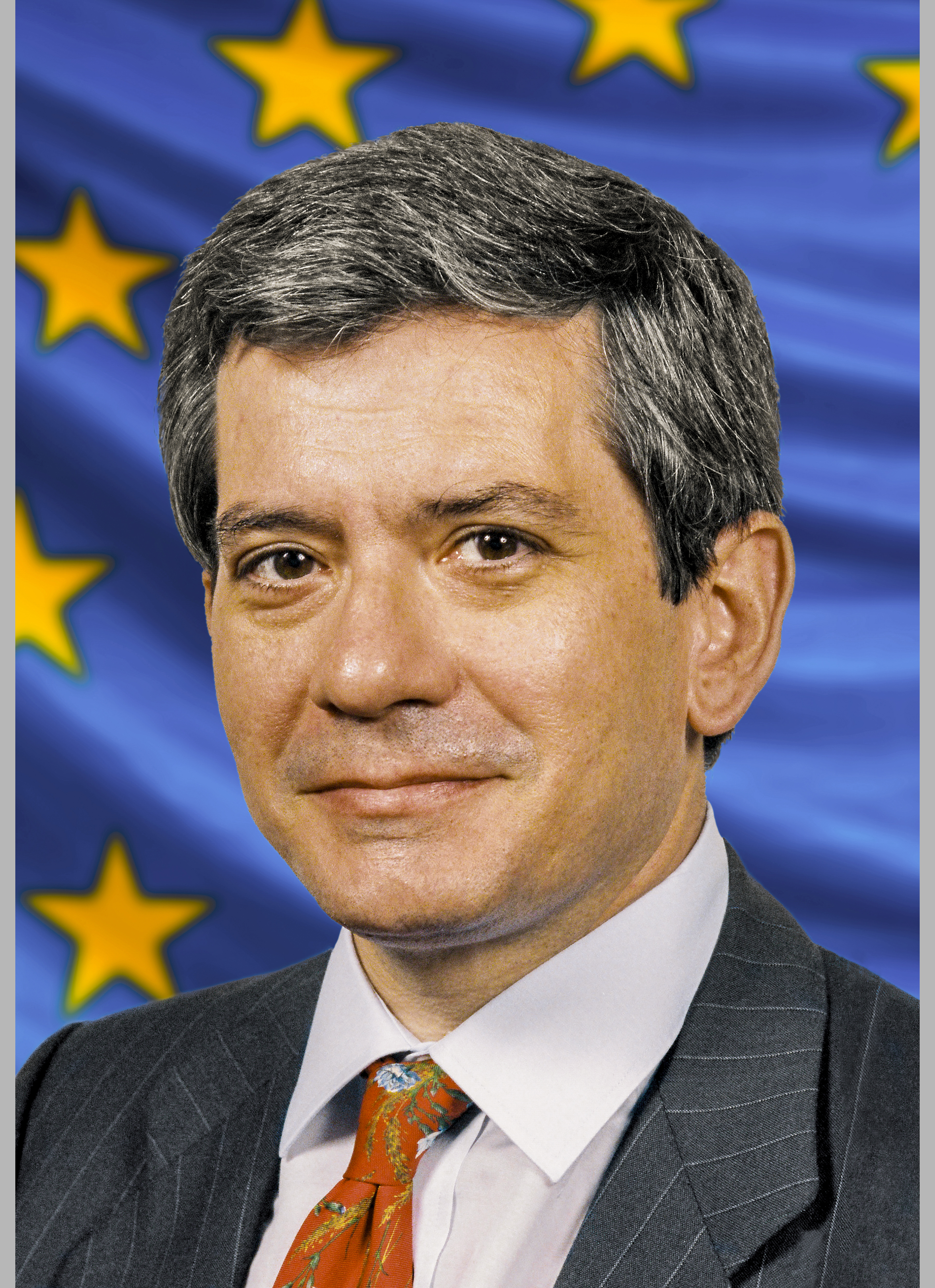
- Official portrait, 1989

President of the European Parliament
- In office 25 July 1989 – 21 January 1992
- Preceded by: Charles Henry Plumb
- Succeeded by: Egon Klepsch

Personal details
- Born: 27 March 1944 (age 82) Madrid, Spain
- Party: PSOE, PES
- Education: Royal Agricultural University
- Profession: Economist

Enrique Barόn Crespo (born 27 March 1944) is a Spanish politician, economist, and lawyer. He is a member of the Spanish Socialist Workers' Party and was a member of the European Parliament for the Party of European Socialists group until 2009.

Enrique Barón graduated in law from the University of Madrid and in business administration at ICADE, in Madrid, and ESSEC, in Paris, business schools, in 1965. As a practising lawyer, he specialised in labour law and acted for defendants in political cases (1970–1977).

He was a Deputy in the Cortes (1977–1987) representing Madrid region and was Minister of Transport, Tourism and Communications (1982–1985). In that period he proposed the dismantlement of many miles of both major and secondary railway routes. The proposal was based on reports that understated the importance of these lines.

After election to the European Parliament he was President of the European Parliament (1989–1992), and was PES Group chairman from 1 November 1999 to 15 July 2004. He was Chairman of the Committee on Foreign Affairs (1992–1995).

Barόn is a member of the Board of Advisors of the Global Panel Foundation and the advisory board of think tank Gold Mercury International, London, UK. He is an active player in the Brand EU initiative to improve the management and promotion of the European Union brand and monitor its progress.

In March 2008, Barón Crespo was received by the Italian President Giorgio Napolitano together with the CEO Pier Francesco Guarguaglini and the General Director Giorgio Zappa, at the end of the concerto for the 60th birth anniversary of the Italian arms manufacturer Finmeccanica.

In 1985, Barón resigned as a minister and became a member of the European Parliament after Spain joined the European Union (EU), or what was then the European Community (EC), in 1986. As early as 1987, he ran for President of the European Parliament, but after three rounds of voting, he was defeated by only five votes to his British opponent, Charles Henry Plumb, Baron Plumb. On 25 July 1989, he was elected on the very first ballot as the youngest President of the European Parliament. He relinquished this office - as is customary in the European Parliament - after a two-and-a-half-year term.
