= Ideas of European unity before 1948 =

This article aims to cover ideas of European unity before the formation of the first bodies of what is now the European Union in 1948.

== Early history ==
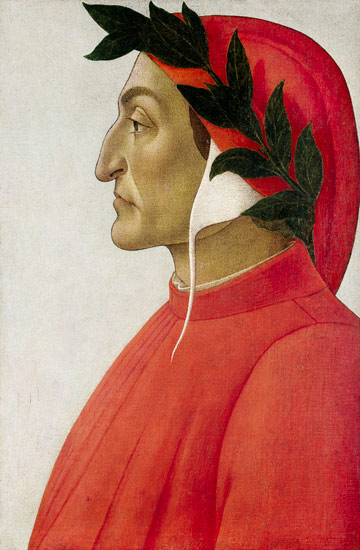
Italian poet Dante Alighieri (1265–1321) has been called a "European federalist ahead of his time"

Ancient concepts of European unity were generally undemocratic, and founded on domination, like the Empire of Alexander the Great, the Roman Empire, or the Catholic Church controlled by the Pope in Rome. The first major phase of European unification can be traced to the Greco-Roman world.

"Europe" as a cultural sphere is first used during the Carolingian dynasty to encompass the Latin Church (as opposed to Eastern Orthodoxy). The first mention of the concepts of "Europe" and "European" dates back to 754 in the Mozarabic Chronicle. The chronicle contains the earliest known reference in a Latin text to "Europeans" (europenses), whom it describes as having defeated the Umayyads at the Battle of Tours (732). As such, European unity was before the 1500s not imagined as a union of equal states, but a notion of a universal Christian order, a single Christendom, under the authority of the papacy and a universal emperor described in historiography as caesaropapism, with the Later Roman Empire as its idealized ancestor.

Italian poet Dante Alighieri proposed an idea of peaceful European union in his De Monarchia (1310s). Because of this, in Italy he is often considered a "European federalist ahead of his time".

Military unions of "Christian European powers" in the medieval and early modern period were directed against Muslim expansion, namely during the Crusades and the Reconquista. A possible early attempt at European unity can be traced back to the Fall of Constantinople to the Turks in 1453; George of Poděbrady, a Hussite king of Bohemia, proposed in 1464 a union of Christian states against the Turks.

In the Renaissance, medieval trade flourished in organisations like the Hanseatic League, stretching from English towns like Boston and London, to Frankfurt, Stockholm and Riga. These traders developed the lex mercatoria, spreading basic norms of good faith and fair dealing through their business.

== Modern era ==
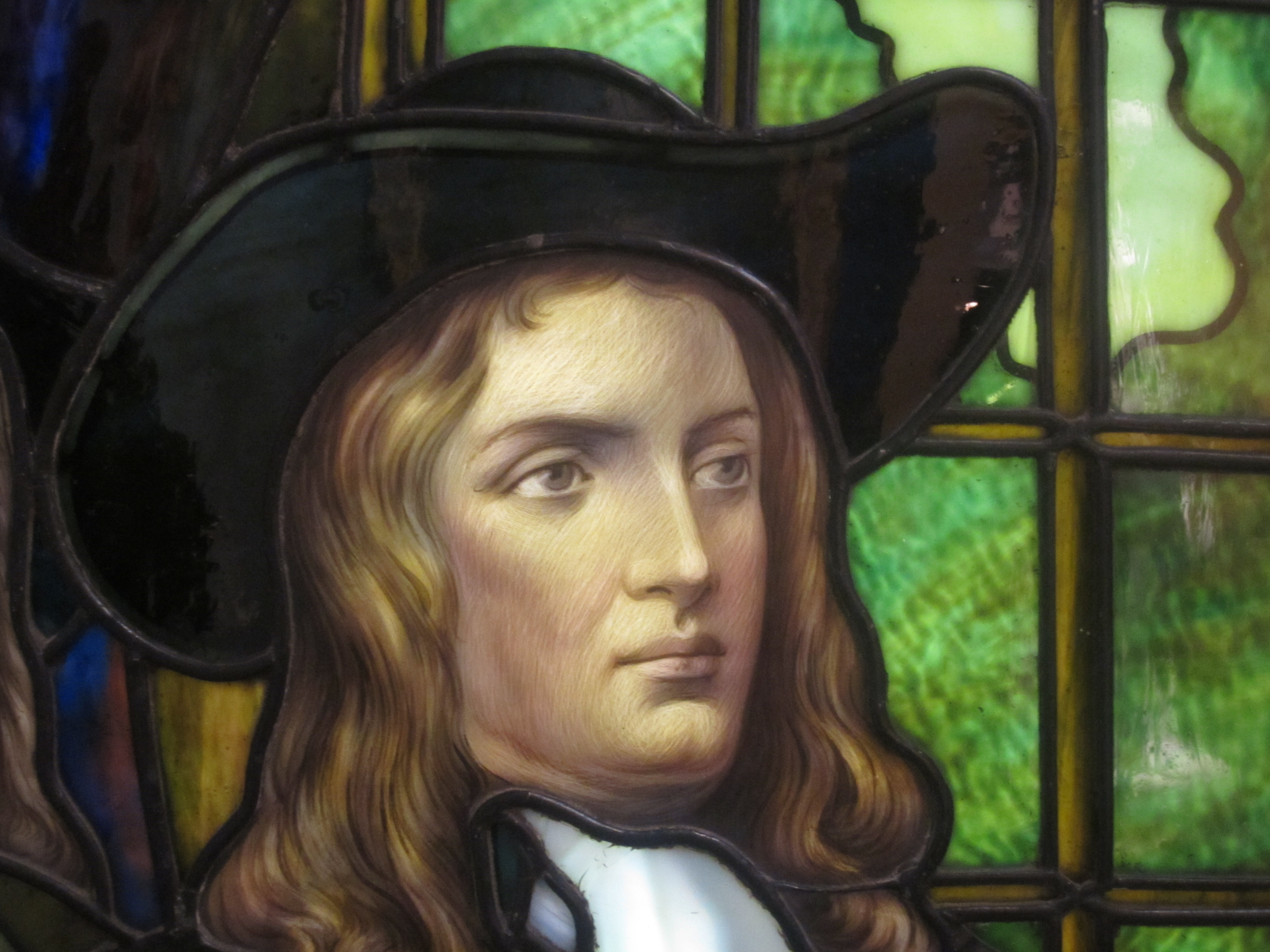
In 1693, William Penn, a Quaker and Anglo-American colonist, proposed a European Parliament to prevent war.

Democratic ideals of integration for international and European nations are as old as the modern nation state.

In 1517, the Protestant Reformation triggered a hundred years of crisis and instability. Martin Luther nailed a list of demands to the church door of Wittenberg, King Henry VIII declared a unilateral split from Rome with the Act of Supremacy 1534, and conflicts flared across the Holy Roman Empire until the Peace of Augsburg 1555 guaranteed each principality the right to its chosen religion (cuius regio, eius religio). This unstable settlement unravelled in the Thirty Years' War (1618–1648), killing around a quarter of the population in central Europe. The Treaty of Westphalia 1648, which brought peace according to a system of international law inspired by Hugo Grotius, is generally acknowledged as the beginning of the nation-state system. Even then, the English Civil War broke out and only ended with the Glorious Revolution of 1688, by Parliament inviting William and Mary from Hannover to the throne, and passing the Bill of Rights 1689.

In 1693, William Penn, a Quaker from London, reacted to the devastation of war in Europe and wrote of a "European dyet, or parliament", to prevent further war, without further defining how such an institution would fit into the political reality of Europe at the time.

In 1713, Abbot Charles de Saint-Pierre proposed the creation of a European league ("Perpetual Union") of 18 sovereign states, with a common treasury, no internal borders and an economic union. The project was taken up by Jean-Jacques Rousseau, and Immanuel Kant after him. Some suggestion of a European union can be inferred from Kant's 1795 proposal for an "eternal peace congress".

The Welsh intellectual Richard Price wrote about an idea for a “united states” of Europe that would maintain liberty and ensure peace on the continent in his Observations on the Nature of Civil Liberty pamphlet about how to resolve the issue with the American colonies in 1776..

After the American Revolutionary War the vision of a United States of Europe, similar to the United States of America, was shared by a few prominent Europeans, notably the Marquis de Lafayette, Henri de Saint-Simon, and Tadeusz Kościuszko.

== 19th century ==
The concept of "Europe" referring to Western Europe or Germanic Europe arose in the 19th century, contrasting with the Russian Empire, as is evidenced in Russian philosopher Danilevsky's Russia and Europe.

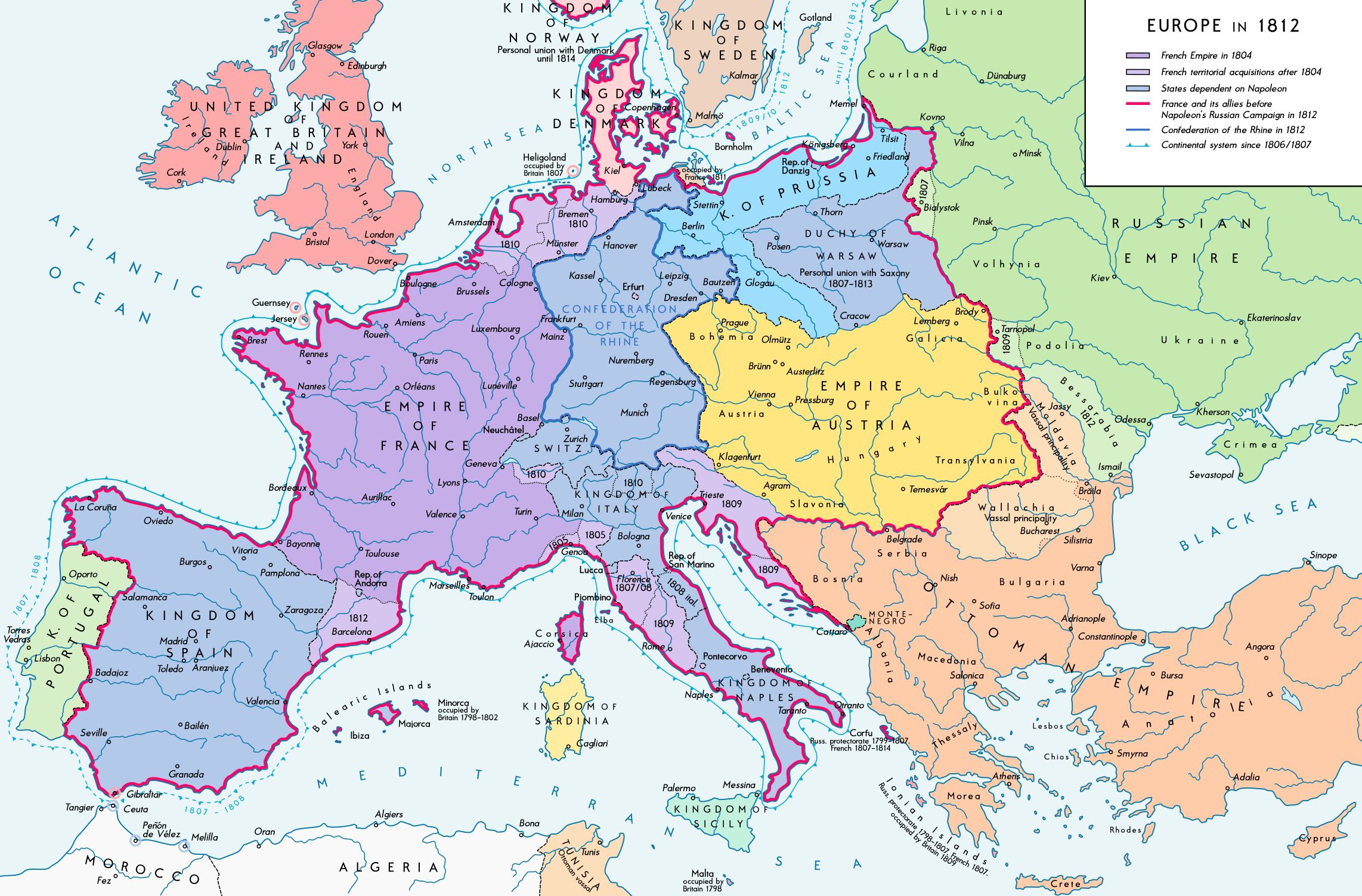
French-dominated Europe in 1812

In the 1800s, a customs union under Napoleon Bonaparte's Continental System was promulgated in November 1806 as an embargo of British goods in the interests of the French hegemony. Felix Markham notes how during a conversation on St. Helena, Napoleon remarked, "Europe thus divided into nationalities freely formed and free internally, peace between States would have become easier: the United States of Europe would become a possibility."

The French socialists Saint-Simon and Augustin Thierry would in 1814 write the essay De la réorganisation de la société européenne, already conjuring up some form of parliamentary European federation.

In the conservative reaction after Napoleon's defeat in 1815, the German Confederation (German: Deutscher Bund) was established as a loose association of thirty-eight sovereign German states formed by the Congress of Vienna. Napoleon had swept away the Holy Roman Empire and simplified the map of Germany. In 1834, the Zollverein ("customs union") was formed among the states of the Confederation, to create better trade flow and reduce internal competition. In spite of the allusion by Fritz Fischer in Germany's Aims in the First World War that an extension of this customs union may have become the model for a unified Europe, the ensuing North German Confederation established in 1866 drifted away from the inclusive multinational character of the preceding German Confederation and the early Kingdom of Prussia, taking instead the direction of staunch German nationalism and brutal subjugation of other nations living within the borders of the succeeding German Empire. The then current and influential German ideas of geopolitics and a Mitteleuropa later became increasingly degenerated due to their underlying principle of German national hegemony, a process culminating in the abhorrent vision laid out by the national socialists of European unity understood as universal servitude of the European nations to the Germans (see below), thus contradicting directly the current intellectual framework for European Union.

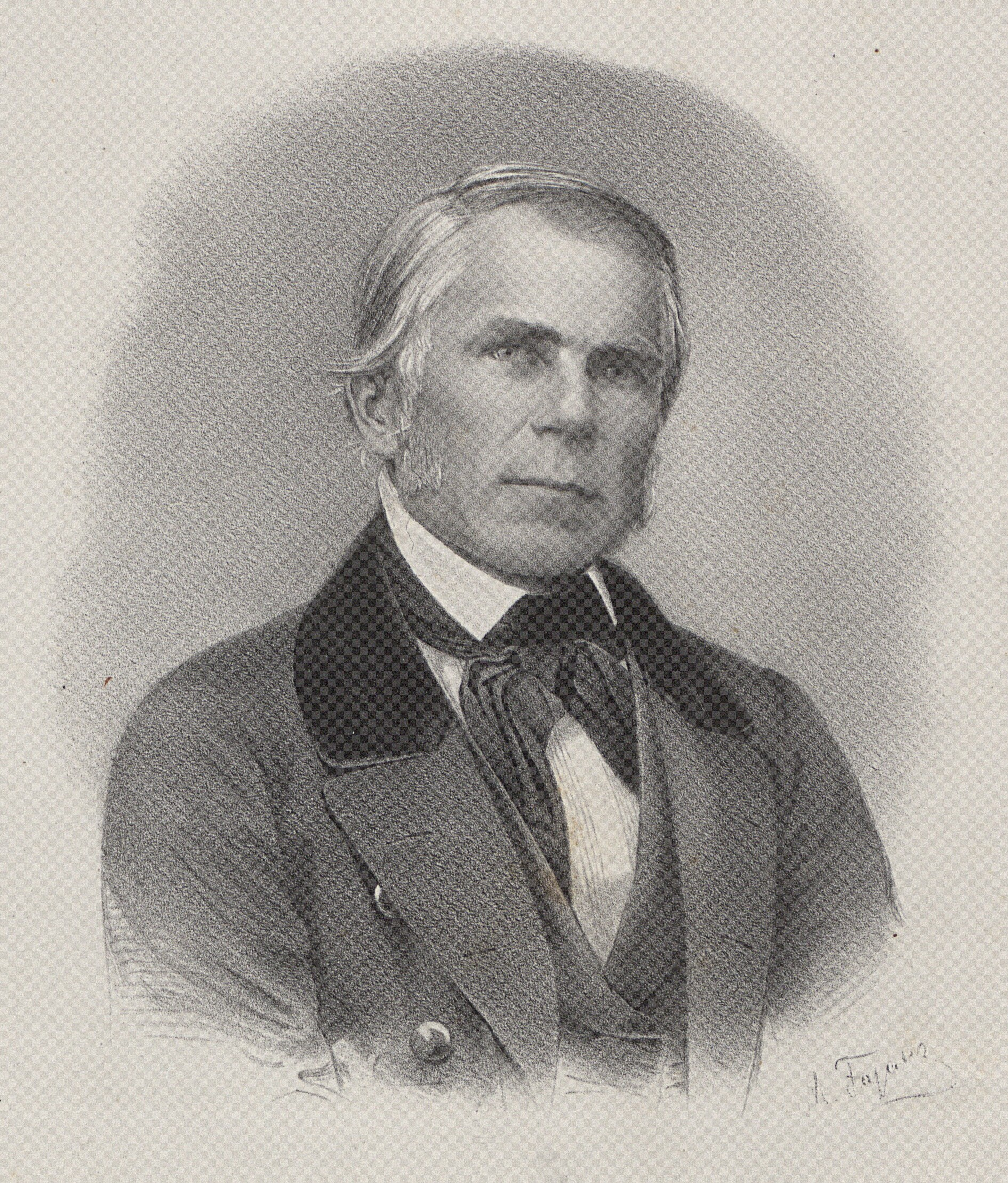
Wojciech Jastrzębowski

On 3 May 1831 the Polish polymath Wojciech Jastrzębowski published On Lasting Peace among the Nations, framing a constitution for a Europe united as a single republic with no internal borders, with a unified legal system, and with institutions staffed by representatives from all of Europe's peoples.

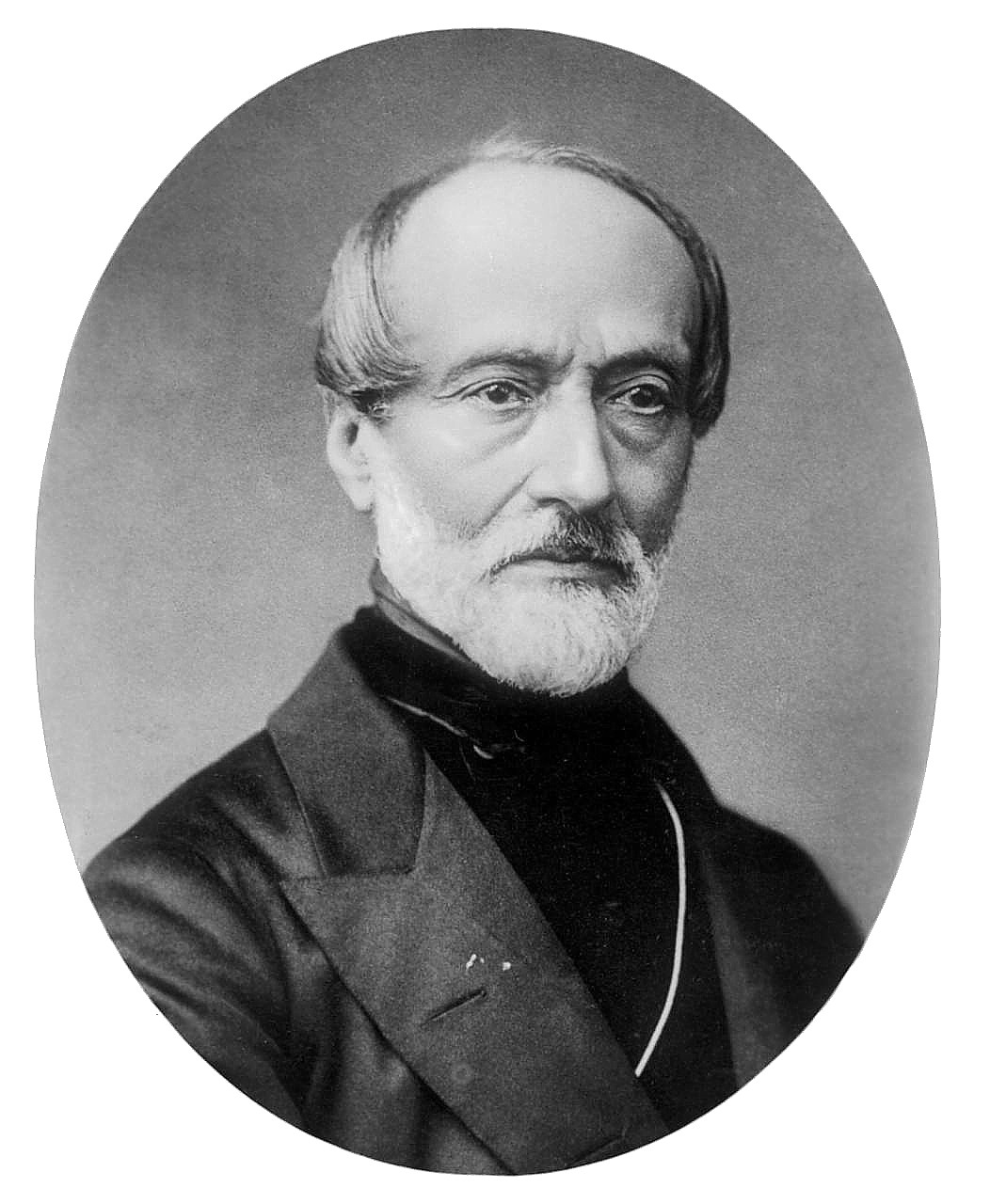
Giuseppe Mazzini, Italian writer and patriot, called for a "Young Europe" of federated republics

In 1834, Giuseppe Mazzini founded Young Europe (Italian: Giovine Europa), an international political association on the model of Young Italy. It was composed of the national societies of Young Italy, Young Poland and Young Germany, which, independent in their own spheres, acted in common, through a central committee, for the furthering of the principles of liberty, equality, and humanity in Europe. The headquarters of the society were in Switzerland, where, in 1835–36, the organization of a French society, Young France, was brought about. The activity of the society speedily aroused the opposition of the Swiss authorities, who expelled many of its members from the country.

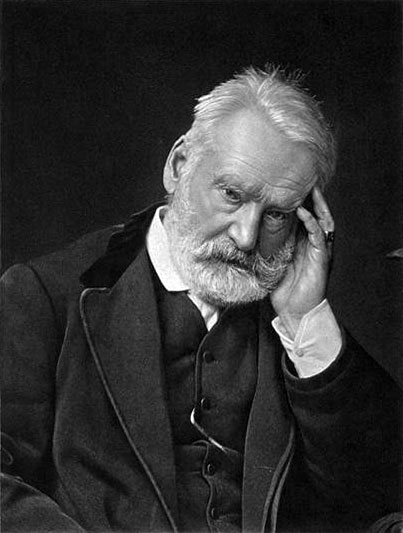
French novelist Victor Hugo argued, in 1849, that "A day will come when we shall see... the United States of America and the United States of Europe face to face, reaching out for each other across the seas."

Giuseppe Mazzini set the stage for perhaps the best known early proposal for peaceful unification, through cooperation and equality of membership, made in 1847 by the pacifist Victor Hugo. Hugo used the term United States of Europe (French: États-Unis d'Europe) during a speech at the International Peace Congress organised by Mazzini, held in Paris in 1849. Hugo favoured the creation of "a supreme, sovereign senate, which will be to Europe what parliament is to England" and said: "A day will come when all nations on our continent will form a European brotherhood ... A day will come when we shall see ... the United States of America and the United States of Europe face to face, reaching out for each other across the seas." He was laughed out of the hall, but returned to his idea again in 1851. Hugo planted an oak tree in the grounds of his residence on the Island of Guernsey, saying that when this tree matured the United States of Europe would have come into being. The tree to this day grows in the gardens of Maison de Hauteville, St. Peter Port, Guernsey, Victor Hugo's residence during his exile from France.

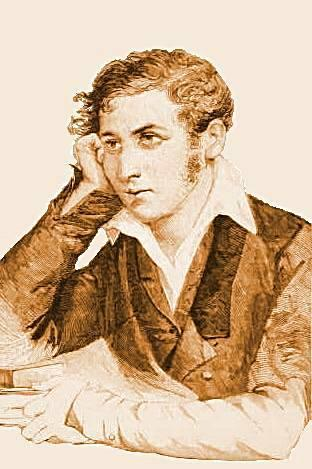
Carlo Cattaneo

The Italian philosopher Carlo Cattaneo wrote "The ocean is rough and whirling, and the currents go to two possible endings: the autocrat, or the United States of Europe". In 1867, Giuseppe Garibaldi, and John Stuart Mill joined Victor Hugo at the first congress of the League of Peace and Freedom in Geneva. Here the anarchist Mikhail Bakunin stated "That in order to achieve the triumph of liberty, justice and peace in the international relations of Europe, and to render civil war impossible among the various peoples which make up the European family, only a single course lies open: to constitute the United States of Europe". The French National Assembly, also called for a United States of Europe on 1 March 1871.

As part of 19th-century concerns about an ailing Europe and the threat posed by the Mahdi, the Polish writer Theodore de Korwin Szymanowski's original contribution was to focus not on nationalism, sovereignty, and federation, but foremost on economics, statistics, monetary policy, and parliamentary reform. His L'Avenir économique, politique et social en Europe (The Future of Europe in Economic, Political and Social Terms), published in Paris in 1885, was in effect a blueprint for a unified Europe with a customs union, a central statistical office, a central bank, and a single currency.

H. G. Wells' 1901 book Anticipations included his prediction that by the year 2000, following the defeat of German imperialism "on land and at sea," there would come into being a European Union.

== Between the World Wars ==
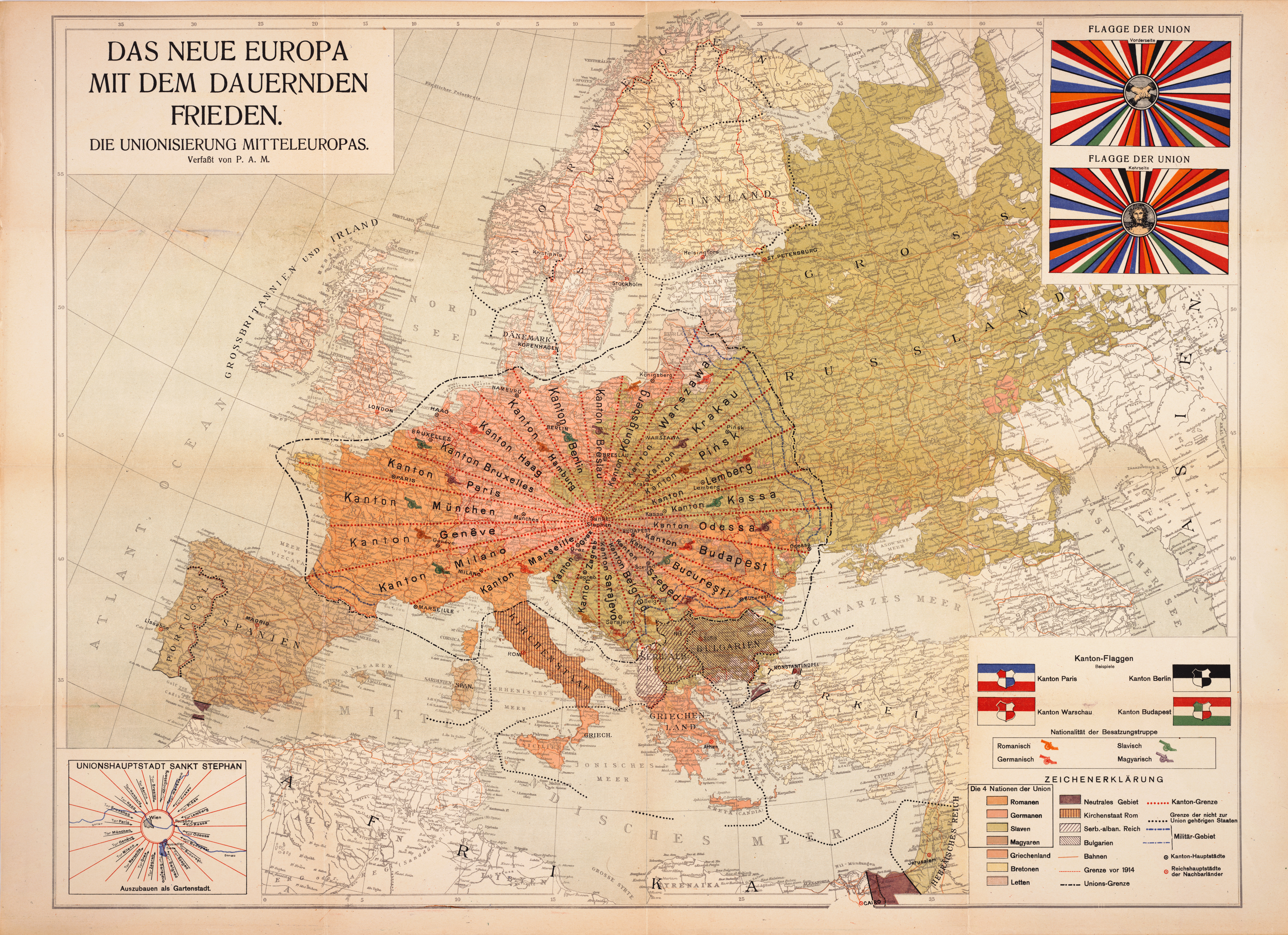
Self-published map of a visionary central European union, 1920, by an enigmatic P. Andreas Mullner

1922 European flag of the Paneuropean Union

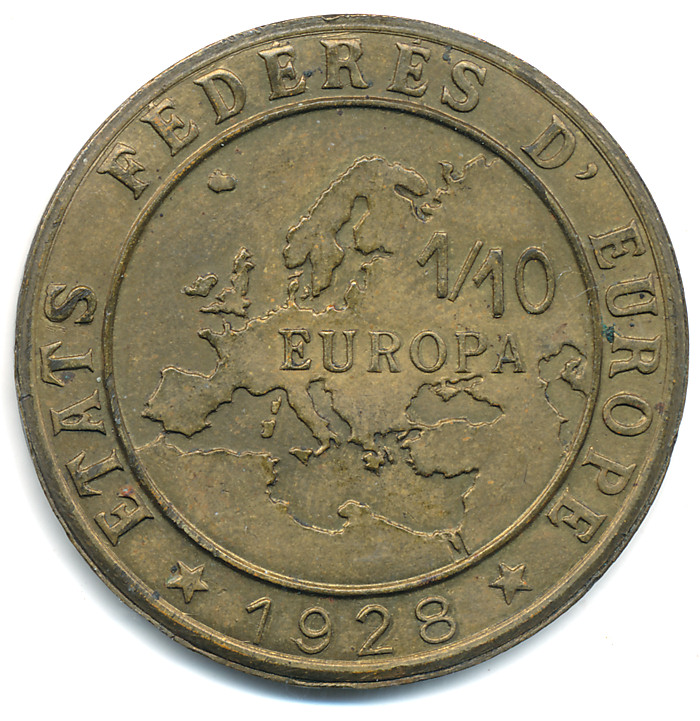
A 1928 Europa coin for the hypothetical "Federated States of Europe" (États fédérés d'Europe)

World War I devastated Europe's society and economy, and the Versailles Treaty failed to establish a workable international system in the League of Nations, any European integration, and imposed punishing terms of reparation payments for the losing countries.

Following the war, thinkers and visionaries from a range of political traditions again began to float the idea of a politically unified Europe. In the early 1920s a range of internationals were founded (or re-founded) to help like-minded political parties to coordinate their activities. These ranged from the Comintern (1919), to the Labour and Socialist International (1921) to the Radical and Democratic Entente of centre-left progressive parties (1924), to the Green International of farmers' parties (1923), to the centre-right International Secretariat of Democratic Parties Inspired by Christianity (1925). While the remit of these internationals was global, the predominance of political parties from Europe meant that they facilitated interaction between the adherents of a given ideology, across European borders. Within each political tradition, voices emerged advocating not merely the cooperation of various national parties, but the pursuit of political institutions at the European level.

With a conservative vision of Europe, the Austrian Count Richard von Coudenhove-Kalergi founded the Pan-Europa movement in 1923, hosting the First Paneuropean Congress in Vienna in 1926, and which contained 8000 members by the time of the 1929 Wall Street crash. The aim was for a specifically Christian, and by implication Catholic, Europe. The British civil servant and future Conservative minister Arthur Salter published a book advocating The United States of Europe in 1933.

In contrast the Soviet commissar (minister) Leon Trotsky raised the slogan "For a Soviet United States of Europe" in 1923, advocating a Europe united along communist principles.

Among liberal-democratic parties, the French centre-left undertook several initiatives to group like-minded parties from the European states. In 1927, the French politician Emil Borel, a leader of the centre-left Radical Party and the founder of the Radical International, set up a French Committee for European Cooperation, and a further twenty countries set up equivalent committees. However, it remained an elite venture: the largest committee, the French one, possessed fewer than six-hundred members, two-thirds of whom were parliamentarians. Two centre-left French prime ministers went further. In 1929 Aristide Briand gave a speech in the presence of the League of Nations Assembly in which he proposed the idea of a federation of European nations based on solidarity and in the pursuit of economic prosperity and political and social co-operation. In 1930, at the League's request, Briand presented a Memorandum on the organisation of a system of European Federal Union. The next year the future French prime minister Édouard Herriot published his book The United States of Europe. Indeed, a template for such a system already existed, in the form of the 1921 Belgian and Luxembourgish customs and monetary union.

Support for the proposals by the French centre-left came from a range of prestigious figures. Many eminent economists, aware that the economic race-to-the-bottom between states was creating ever greater instability, supported the view: these included John Maynard Keynes. The French political scientist and economist Bertrand Jouvenel remembered a widespread mood after 1924 calling for a "harmonisation of national interests along the lines of European union, for the purpose of common prosperity". The Spanish philosopher and politician, Ortega y Gasset, expressed a position shared by many within Republican Spain: "European unity is no fantasy, but reality itself; and the fantasy is precisely the opposite: the belief that France, Germany, Italy or Spain are substantive & independent realities.” Eleftherios Venizelos, Prime Minister of Greece, outlined his government's support in a 1929 speech by saying that "the United States of Europe will represent, even without Russia, a power strong enough to advance, up to a satisfactory point, the prosperity of the other continents as well".

Between the two world wars, the Polish statesman Józef Piłsudski envisaged the idea of a European federation that he called Międzymorze ("Intersea" or "Between-seas"), known in English as Intermarium, which was a Polish-oriented version of Mitteleuropa, though devised according to the principle of cooperation rather than subjugation.

The Great Depression, the rise of fascism and communism and subsequently World War II prevented the interwar movements from gaining further support: between 1933 and 1936 most of Europe's remaining democracies became dictatorships, and even Ortega's Spain and Venizelos's Greece had both been plunged into civil war. One of the more prominent politicians supportive of pan-European ideas during this time was Milan Hodža, who served as the Prime Minister of Czechoslovakia from 1935 to 1938. While in exile during World War II, Hodža published a book titled Federation in Central Europe, envisioning a federation of countries between Germany and the Soviet Union, similar to Piłsudski's Intermarium. Hodža was a member of the Czechoslovak Agrarian Party and his ideas were largely supported by other agrarian parties of Eastern Europe and the Balkans, which were members of the International Agrarian Bureau.

Many of the pan-European social democratic and liberal politicians that lost influence in the 1930s would rise to prominence once again after the end of World War II in the 1940s and 1950s.

== World War II ==
In Britain the group known as Federal Union was launched in November 1938, and began advocating a Federal Union of Europe as a post-war aim. Its papers and arguments became well known among resistants to fascism across Europe and contributed to their thinking of how to rebuild Europe after the war.

Among those who were early advocates of a union of European nations was Hungarian Prime Minister Pál Teleki. Hungary had lost over two-thirds of its territory at the end of World War I in the 1920 Treaty of Trianon. In early 1941 during World War II, he was striving to keep Hungary autonomous. Internally, he tried to satisfy national pride which demanded a restoration of the lost territories, which Germany had supported in the First Vienna Award of 1938 and the Second Vienna Award of 1940. Externally, he was striving to preserve his country's military and economic independence in the face of Germany's coercive pressure to join in their invasion of Yugoslavia. In the book, Transylvania. The Land Beyond the Forest Louis C. Cornish described how Teleki, under constant surveillance by the German Gestapo during 1941, sent a secret communication to contacts in America.

He foresaw clearly the complete defeat of Nazi Germany, and the European chaos that would result from the war. He believed that no future was conceivable for any of the minor nations in Central and Eastern Europe if they tried to continue to live their isolated national lives. He asked his friends in America to help them establish a federal system, to federate. This alone could secure for them the two major assets of national life: first, political and military security, and, second, economic prosperity. Hungary, he emphasized, stood ready to join in such collaboration, provided it was firmly based on the complete equality of all the members states.

Journalist Dorothy Thompson in 1941 supported the statement of others. "I took from Count Teleki's office a monograph which he had written upon the structure of European nations. A distinguished geographer, he was developing a plan for regional federation, based upon geographical and economic realities." Teleki received no response from the Americans to his ideas and when German troops moved through Hungary on 2–3 April 1941 during the invasion of Yugoslavia, he committed suicide.

In 1943, the German ministers Joachim von Ribbentrop and Cecil von Renthe-Fink eventually proposed the creation of a "European confederacy" as part of a New Order on the continent. The proposal, which attracted little support from the Nazi leadership, would have had a single currency, a central bank in Berlin, a regional principle, a labour policy and economic and trading agreements, but left all states clearly subordinated to Nazi Germany. The countries proposed for inclusion were Germany, Italy, France, Denmark, Norway, Finland, Slovakia, Hungary, Bulgaria, Romania, Croatia, Serbia, Sweden, Greece and Spain. Such a German-led Europe, it was hoped, would serve as a strong alternative to the Communist Soviet Union and the United States. It is worth noting that Austria, the Benelux countries, the Czech Republic, Poland, Slovenia and Switzerland, the Baltic states, Russia, Belarus and Ukraine were omitted from the list of proposed countries: plans or faits accomplis already existed for their integration into a Greater Germanic Reich or for colonial status (Generalplan Ost). The later Foreign Minister Arthur Seyss-Inquart (in office: April to May 1945) said: "The new Europe of solidarity and co-operation among all its people will find rapidly increasing prosperity once national economic boundaries are removed", while the Vichy French Minister Jacques Benoist-Méchin said that France had to "abandon nationalism and take place in the European community with honour". These pan-European illusions from the early 1940s were never realised because of Germany's defeat. Neither Hitler, nor many of his leading hierarchs such as Goebbels, had the slightest intention of compromising absolute German hegemony through the creation of a European confederation. Although this fact has been used to insinuate the charge of fascism in the EU, the idea is much older than the Nazis, foreseen by John Maynard Keynes, and later by Winston Churchill and by various anti-Nazi resistance movements.

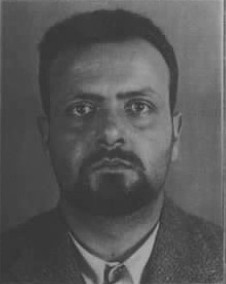
Imprisoned by the Italian fascist regime in 1937, Altiero Spinelli, considered as a founding father of the EU, wrote with Eugenio Colorni and Ernesto Rossi in prison on the island Ventotene the Ventotene Manifesto, becoming the programme of the 1943 in Milan founded European Federalist Movement.

"A one sided Prussian militarism must never again be allowed to assume power. Only in large-scale cooperation among the nations of Europe can the ground be prepared for reconstruction...Freedom of speech, freedom of religion, the protection of individual citizens from the arbitrary will of criminal regimes of violence – these will be the bases of the New Europe."

— Aufruf an alle Deutsche! pamphlet by the White Rose, January 1943

One of the most influential figures in this process was Altiero Spinelli, author of the Ventotene Manifesto entitled "Towards a Free and United Europe" and smuggled out of an internment camp – on the island of Ventotene – as early as 1941, well before the outcome of the war was safely predictable, and widely circulated in the resistance movements. Spinelli, Ursula Hirschmann and Colorni, Rossi and some 20 other established, as soon as they were able to leave their internment camp, the Movimento Federalista Europeo (MFE). The founding meeting, secretly held in Milan on the 27/28 August 1943, adopted a "political thesis" which, inter alia, stated: "if a post war order is established in which each State retains its complete national sovereignty, the basis for a Third World War would still exist even after the Nazi attempt to establish the domination of the German race in Europe has been frustrated". In 1943, Jean Monnet a member of the National Liberation Committee of the Free French government in exile in Algiers, and regarded by many as the future architect of European unity, is recorded as declaring to the committee: "There will be no peace in Europe, if the states are reconstituted on the basis of national sovereignty ... The countries of Europe are too small to guarantee their peoples the necessary prosperity and social development. The European states must constitute themselves into a federation ...". Winston Churchill called in 1943 for a post-war "Council of Europe".

Towards the end of World War II, the Three Allied Powers discussed during the Tehran Conference and the ensuing 1943 Moscow Conference the plans to establish joint institutions. This led to a decision at the Yalta Conference in 1945 to include Free France as the Fourth Allied Power and to form a European Advisory Commission, later replaced by the Council of Foreign Ministers and the Allied Control Council, following the German surrender and the Potsdam Agreement in 1945.

== Postwar developments (1945-1948) ==
After the war on 19 September 1946 Churchill went further as a civilian, after leaving his office, at the University of Zürich, calling for a United States of Europe. Coincidentally parallel to his speech the Hertenstein Congress in the Lucerne Canton was being held, resulting in the Union of European Federalists. Richard von Coudenhove-Kalergi, who successfully established during the interwar period the oldest organization for European integration, the Paneuropean Union, founded in June 1947 the European Parliamentary Union (EPU). To ensure Germany could never threaten the peace again, its heavy industry was partly dismantled (See: Allied plans for German industry after World War II) and its main coal-producing regions were either awarded to neighbouring countries (Silesia), managed as separate directly by an occupying power (Saarland) or put under international control (Ruhr area).

The growing rift among the Four Powers became evident as a result of the rigged 1947 Polish legislative election which constituted an open breach of the Yalta Agreement, followed by the announcement of the Truman Doctrine on 12 March 1947. On 4 March 1947 France and the United Kingdom signed the Treaty of Dunkirk for mutual assistance in the event of future military aggression in the aftermath of World War II against any of the pair. The rationale for the treaty was the threat of a potential future military attack, specifically a Soviet one in practice, though publicised under the disguise of a German one, according to the official statements. Immediately following the February 1948 coup d'état by the Communist Party of Czechoslovakia, the London Six-Power Conference was held, resulting in the Soviet boycott of the Allied Control Council and its incapacitation, an event marking the beginning of the Cold War. The remainder of the year 1948 marked the beginning of the institutionalised modern European integration.

== See also ==
- Continental System – 1806–1814 embargo of Europe against Britain
- Federal Europe – Speculative future European federation
- History of the European Union
- Pan-European identity – Personal identification with Europe
- Universal Monarchy – Sovereign predominant over other states
