= SUFE (disambiguation) =

SUFE is the Shanghai University of Finance and Economics, a research university in Shanghai, China.

SUFE may also refer to:

- Slipped Upper Femoral Epiphysis, a medical term also known as Slipped Capital Femoral Epiphysis
- Stand Up For Europe, a eurofederalist political organisation
