= Consensus–expectations gap =

A consensus–expectations gap is a gap between what a group of decision-makers are expected to agree on, and what they are actually able to agree on. The expression was first used by Asle Toje in the book The European Union as a small power: after the post-Cold War. The term owes to Christopher Hill's capability–expectations gap between what the European Communities had been talked up to do and what the collective was actually able to deliver. Hill saw the capability–expectations gap as having three primary components, namely, the ability to agree, resource availability and the instruments at its disposal. The 'consensus–expectations gap' focuses on one of Hill's variables: the ability to agree.
