= Federalisation of the European Union =

Proposals to federalise the European Union

European Union

European Economic Area

Schengen Area

Eurozone

There is ongoing discussion about the extent to which the European Union (EU) has already turned from a confederation (a union of sovereign states) into a federation (a single federal state with a central government, consisting of a number of partially self-governing federated states) over the course of decades, and to what degree it should continue to evolve in a federalist direction. As of April 2026, the EU has no formal plans to become a federation.

Since the 1950s, European integration has seen the development of a supranational system of governance, as its institutions move further from the concept of simple intergovernmentalism and more towards a federalised system. However, with the Maastricht Treaty of 1992, new intergovernmental elements have been introduced alongside the more federal systems, making it more difficult to define the EU. The European Union, which operates through a hybrid system – thus often described as sui generis – of intergovernmentalism and supranationalism, is not officially a federation or even a confederation, although many contemporary scholars of federalism view it as a federal system.

== History ==
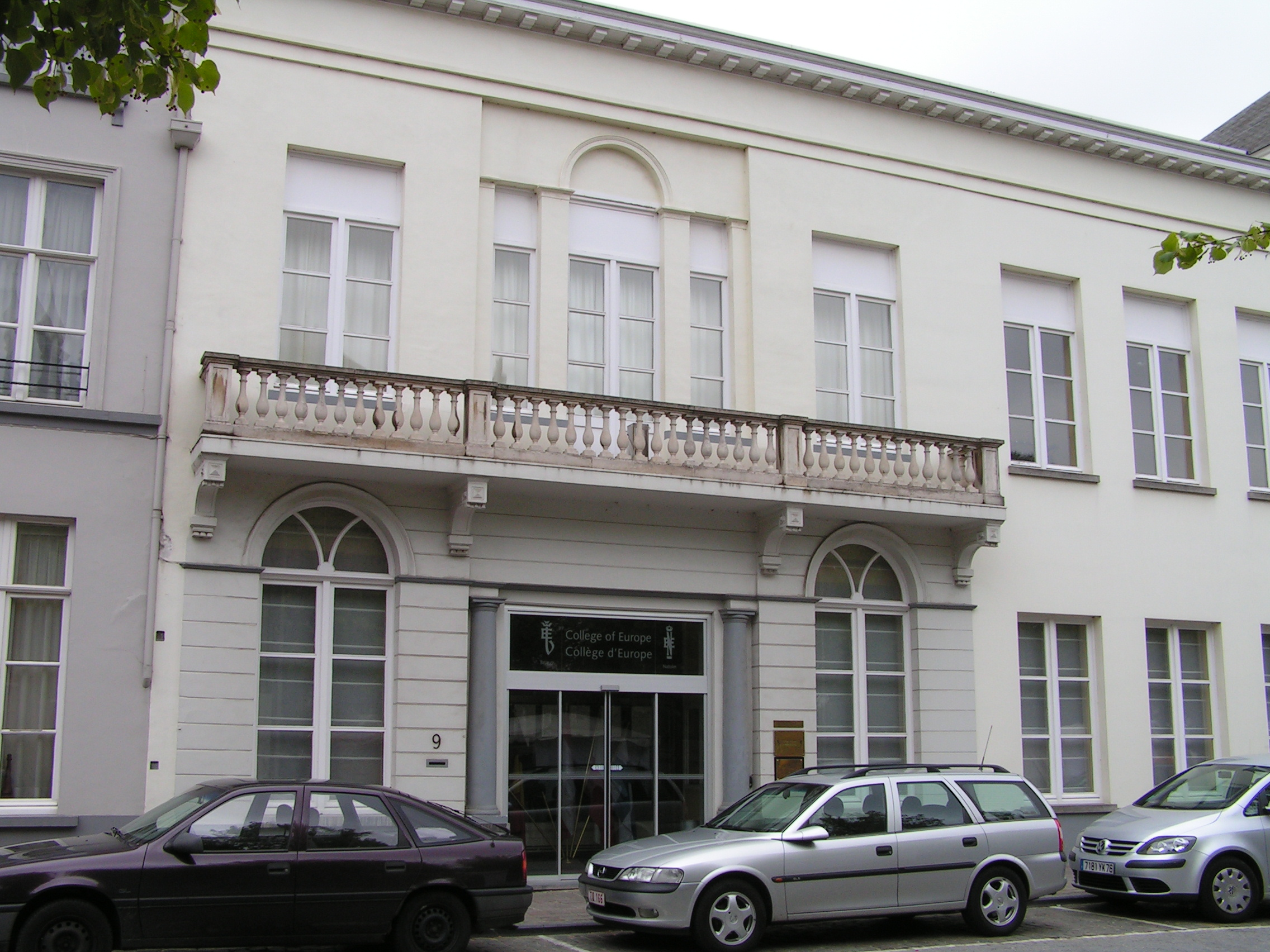
The College of Europe in Belgium was founded after the 1948 Hague Congress, a pivotal moment in European federal history that also led to the creation of the European Movement.

A Pan-European movement gained some momentum from the 1920s with the creation of the Paneuropean Union, based on Richard von Coudenhove-Kalergi's 1923 manifesto Paneuropa, which presented the idea of a unified European State. This movement, led by Coudenhove-Kalergi and subsequently by Otto von Habsburg, is the oldest European unification movement. His ideas influenced Aristide Briand, who gave a speech in favour of a European Union in the League of Nations on 8 September 1929, and in 1930, who wrote his "Memorandum on the Organization of a Regime of European Federal Union" for the Government of France.

At the end of World War II, the political climate favoured unity in Western Europe, seen by many as an escape from the extreme forms of nationalism which had devastated the continent.

One of the first practical and successful proposals for European cooperation came in 1951 with the European Coal and Steel Community. Since then, the European Community has gradually evolved to Union in which a whole range of policy areas where its member states hope to benefit from working together.

The process of intergovernmentally pooling powers, harmonising national policies and creating and enforcing supranational institutions, is called European integration. Other than the vague aim of "ever closer union" in the 1983 Solemn Declaration on European Union, the Union (meaning its member governments) has no current policy to create a federal state.

Debate on European unity is often vague as to the boundaries of 'Europe'. The word 'Europe' is widely used as a synonym for the European Union, although most of the European continent's geographical area is not in the EU, and some of the EU is outside of Europe (e.g. French Guiana). Most of Europe's people do, however, live in the EU.

=== Multi-speed integration ===
The multi-speed Europe thesis envisions an alternative type of European integration, where the EU countries that want a more integrated EU can accelerate their own integration, whereas other countries may go at a slower pace or cease further integration altogether. Specific current examples include the Eurozone and the Schengen Area, which not all members have joined.

== Present situation ==
A clickable Euler diagram showing the relationships between various European regional organisations

The European Union (EU) is not legally (de jure) a federation, although various academics have argued that it contains some federal characteristics. About how various scholars approach the issue, R. Daniel Kelemen of Rutgers University said: "Unencumbered by the prejudice that the EU is sui generis and incomparable, federalism scholars now regularly treat the EU as a case in their comparative studies (Friedman-Goldstein, 2001; Filippov, Ordeshook, Shevtsova, 2004; Roden, 2005; Bednar, 2006). For the purposes of the present analysis, the EU has the necessary minimal attributes of a federal system and crucially the EU is riven with many of the same tensions that afflict federal systems."

According to Joseph H. H. Weiler, "Europe has charted its own brand of constitutional federalism". Jean-Michel Josselin and Alain Marciano see the European Court of Justice as being a primary force behind building a federal legal order in the Union with Josselin stating that "A complete shift from a confederation to a federation would have required to straightforwardly replace the principality of the member states vis-à-vis the Union by that of the European citizens. … As a consequence, both confederate and federate features coexist in the judicial landscape."

Thomas Risse and Tanja A. Börzel wrote: "The EU only lacks two significant features of a federation. First, the Member States remain the 'masters' of the treaties, i.e., they have the exclusive power to amend or change the constitutive treaties of the EU. Second, the EU lacks a real 'tax and spend' capacity, in other words, there is no fiscal federalism."

Other academics have argued that the EU is unlikely to evolve into a unified federal state. Kelemen has taken this view himself in a paper co-written with Andy Tarrant, arguing that limits placed on the bureaucratic capacity of the European institutions – such as the relatively small size of the European Commission – form a barrier to the creation of a federal European state. In their words: "widespread political opposition to the creation of anything approximating a large, unified executive bureaucracy in Brussels has long-since ended hopes, for the few who harboured them, of creating a European superstate." Some common points in this context are that the European budget is very small and does not finance a lot of the economic activity of the European Union; that each member state of the European Union has its own foreign relations and its own military; that it is often the case that European Union member states decide to opt out of agreements which they oppose; and that member states still retain sovereignty over a large number of areas which might be expected to be transferred to a federal authority under a federal system. One important fact is that treaties must be agreed by all member states even if a particular treaty has support among the vast majority of the population of the European Union. Member states may also want legally binding guarantees that a particular treaty will not affect a nation's position on certain issues.

Use of the word 'federal' is itself the cause of some disagreement. Valéry Giscard d'Estaing found opposition from the United Kingdom towards including the word "federal" in the proposed European Constitution, and hence replaced the word with "Community".

In November 2021, the now former German government, the Scholz cabinet, called for European federalism in the coalition agreement and wanted to help achieve this. The Russian Invasion of Ukraine and growing tensions between USA and Europe during the second presidency of Donald Trump, contributed to the emergence of new pan-European movements and parties like Ave Europa, Union of European Federalists, and Volt Europa calling for turning the EU into a proper federal republic.

== See also ==
- Anti-Europeanism – Political term for opposition to Europe
- Arab Union – Ideology espousing the unification of the Arab world
- Consociationalism – Political power sharing among cultural groups
- Democracy in Europe Movement 2025 – Left-wing European political alliance
- European Federalist Party – French political party and former European political alliance
- European Movement International – Lobbying association for European integration
- Euroscepticism – Body of criticism of the European Union
- Nation state – Political term for a state that is based around a nation
- Politics of Europe
- Pro-Europeanism – Favouring European integration
- Pulse of Europe – Citizen's initiative for pan-Europeanism
- Sovereignty – Supreme authority within a territory
- Spinelli Group – Campaign for a federal Europe
- Stand Up for Europe – Movement for democracy & federalism
- Subsidiarity (European Union) – Principle of governance of the European Union
- Union of European Federalists – Non-governmental organisation, campaigning for a Federal Europe
- United States of Africa – Political concept similar to the hypothesised United States of Europe
- United States of Europe – Speculative future European federation
- United States of Europe (electoral list)
- Volt Europa – Federalist European political alliance
