= Federal Europe =

Speculative future European federation

European Union

Council of Europe

Schengen Area
Schengen Area
Countries with open borders to the Schengen area
Member of the EU committed by treaty to join the Schengen Area in the future

European Economic Area
European Union
Iceland, Norway (without Svalbard) and Liechtenstein

A federal Europe, also referred to as the United States of Europe (USE) or a European federation, is a hypothetical scenario of European integration leading to the formation of a sovereign superstate (similar to the United States of America), organised as a federation of the member countries of the European Union (EU), as contemplated by political scientists, politicians, geographers, historians, futurologists and fiction writers. At present, while the EU is not officially a federation or even a confederation, most contemporary scholars of federalism view the EU as a federal system, a supranational union, which has a flexible (see right to secession, Article 50 and Brexit) membership and competence delegation.

== History ==
Various versions of the concept have developed over the centuries, many of which are mutually incompatible (inclusion or exclusion of the United Kingdom, secular or religious union, etc.). Such proposals include those from Bohemian King George of Poděbrady in 1464; Duc de Sully of France in the seventeenth century; and the plan of William Penn, the Quaker founder of Pennsylvania, for the establishment of a "European Dyet, Parliament or Estates". The Welsh intellectual Richard Price wrote about an idea for a “united states" of Europe that would maintain liberty and ensure peace on the continent in his pamphlet Observations on the Nature of Civil Liberty, about how to resolve the issue with the American colonies in 1776. George Washington also allegedly voiced support for a "United States of Europe", although the authenticity of this statement has been questioned.

=== 19th century ===
Felix Markham notes how during a conversation on St. Helena, Napoleon Bonaparte remarked: "Europe thus divided into nationalities freely formed and free internally, peace between States would have become easier: the United States of Europe would become a possibility". "United States of Europe" was also the name of the concept presented by Wojciech Jastrzębowski in About eternal peace between the nations, published 31 May 1831. The project consisted of 77 articles. The envisioned United States of Europe was to be an international organisation rather than a superstate. Giuseppe Mazzini, an early advocate of a "United States of Europe" regarded European unification as a logical continuation of the unification of Italy. Mazzini created the Young Europe movement.

The term "United States of Europe" (French: États-Unis d'Europe) was used by Victor Hugo, including during a speech at the International Peace Congress held in Paris in 1849. Hugo favoured the creation of "a supreme, sovereign senate, which will be to Europe what parliament is to England" and said: "A day will come when all nations on our continent will form a European brotherhood ... A day will come when we shall see ... the United States of America and the United States of Europe face to face, reaching out for each other across the seas". During his exile from France, Hugo planted a tree in the grounds of his residence on the Island of Guernsey and was noted in saying that when this tree matured the United States of Europe would have come into being. This tree to this day is still growing in the gardens of Maison de Hauteville, St. Peter Port, Guernsey.

In 1867, Giuseppe Garibaldi and John Stuart Mill joined Victor Hugo at the first congress of the League of Peace and Freedom in Geneva. Here the anarchist Mikhail Bakunin stated: "That in order to achieve the triumph of liberty, justice and peace in the international relations of Europe, and to render civil war impossible among the various peoples who make up the European family, only a single course lies open: to constitute the United States of Europe".

=== Early 20th century ===
"Under a capitalist regime, the United States of Europe are either impossible or reactionary."

— V. I. Lenin

In 1906, Aurel C. Popovici, a Banatian Romanian lawyer who was close to Archduke Franz Ferdinand, proposed the transformation of Austria-Hungary into a federation of 15 national states with equal rights. The project was named United States of Greater Austria and it was endorsed by Franz Ferdinand. However, the start of the First World War and the dissolution of Austria-Hungary led to the project being scrapped.

Before the communist revolution in Russia, Leon Trotsky foresaw a "Federated Republic of Europe — the United States of Europe", created by the proletariat. Following the First World War, some thinkers and visionaries again began to float the idea of a politically unified Europe. A Pan-European movement gained some momentum from the 1920s with the creation of the Paneuropean Union, based on Richard von Coudenhove-Kalergi's 1923 manifesto Paneuropa, which presented the idea of a unified European State. This movement, led by Coudenhove-Kalergi and subsequently by Otto von Habsburg, is the oldest European unification movement. In 1923, the Austrian Count Richard von Coudenhove-Kalergi founded the Pan-Europa Movement and hosted the First Paneuropean Congress, held in Vienna in 1926. The aim was for a Europe based on the principles of liberalism, Christianity and social responsibility.

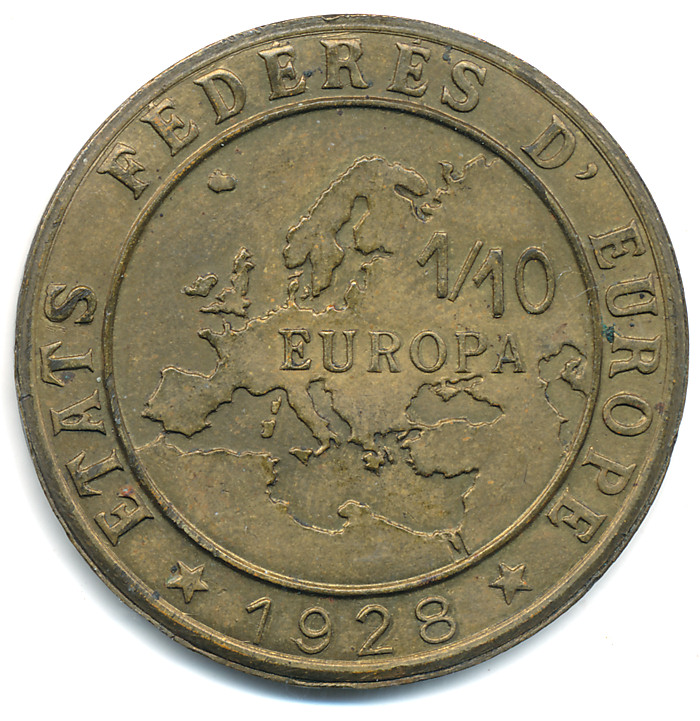
Coin created to promote European Federation in 1928

His ideas influenced Aristide Briand, French Prime Minister, who gave on 8 September 1929 a speech before the Assembly of the League of Nations in which he proposed the idea of a federation of European nations based on solidarity and in the pursuit of economic prosperity and political and social co-operation. At the League's request, Briand presented in 1930 his "Memorandum on the Organization of a Regime of European Federal Union" for the Government of France. In the early 1930s, French politician Édouard Herriot and British civil servant Arthur Salter both penned books titled The United States of Europe.

After the First World War, Winston Churchill had seen continental Europe as a source of threats and sought to avoid the United Kingdom's involvement in European conflicts. On 15 February 1930, Churchill commented in the American journal The Saturday Evening Post that a "European Union" was possible between continental states, but without the United Kingdom's involvement:

We see nothing but good and hope in a richer, freer, more contented European commonality. But we have our own dream and our own task. We are with Europe, but not of it. We are linked but not compromised. We are interested and associated but not absorbed.

During the 1930s, Churchill was influenced by and became an advocate of the ideas of Richard von Coudenhove-Kalergi and his Paneuropean Union, though Churchill did not then advocate the United Kingdom's membership of such a union. (Churchill revisited the idea in 1946 and advocated British participation.)

During the World War II victories of Nazi Germany in 1940, Wilhelm II stated that "the hand of God is creating a new world & working miracles. ... We are becoming the United States of Europe under German leadership, a united European Continent".

In 1941, the Italian anti-fascists Altiero Spinelli and Ernesto Rossi wrote the Ventotene Manifesto, encouraging a federation of European states. It argued that, if the fight against the fascist powers were successful, it would be in vain if it merely led to the re-establishment of the old European system of sovereign nation-states in shifting alliances. This would inevitably lead to war again. The document called for the establishment of a European federation by the democratic powers after the war. It was widely circulated through the Italian Resistance, and then in other anti-fascist resistance movements. Resistance leaders from several countries met clandestinely in Geneva in 1944, a meeting attended by Spinelli. Back in Italy, Spinelli, along with others, founded the European Federalist Movement (MFE), which later spread to other European countries as the Union of European Federalists (UEF).

The European Confederation (German: Europäischer Staatenbund) was a proposed political institution of European unity, which was to be part of a wider restructuring (Neuordnung). Proposed by German Foreign Minister Joachim von Ribbentrop in March 1943, the concept was rejected by Adolf Hitler. Also in 1943 the Italian Fascists proposed the creation of a 'European Community' free of British 'intrigues' at their Congress of Verona in their newly declared Salo Republic (Mussolini having been rescued from captivity).

=== Post-World War II ===
As early as 21 October 1942, in a minute to his Foreign Secretary, Winston Churchill had written, "I look forward to a United States of Europe in which the barriers between the nations will be greatly minimised and unrestricted travel will be possible".

Churchill called for a "United States of Europe" in a speech delivered on 19 September 1946 at the University of Zurich, Switzerland. In this speech given after the end of the Second World War, Churchill concluded:

We must build a kind of United States of Europe. In this way only will hundreds of millions of toilers be able to regain the simple joys and hopes which make life worth living.

While Churchill advocated a united Europe, he initially saw Britain and its Commonwealth, along with the United States of America, and Soviet Russia as "the friends and sponsors of the new Europe", separate to a United States of Europe led by France and Germany. But as the first steps to European unity were taken, Churchill changed his position and advocated the creation of a United Europe that would include Britain. He lent his considerable personal prestige to the Congress of Europe in 1948 in The Hague, where he called for the 16 democratic European countries, "including Great Britain, linked with her Empire and Commonwealth", to start building Europe, aiming "at the union of Europe as a whole"

Churchill's was a more cautious approach to European integration, avoiding the word "federal". It was sometimes described as "Unionist". A United Europe Movement advocated inter-governmental arrangements while the Federalists focused on the importance of establishing a European parliamentary assembly. Following the 1948 Congress of Europe in The Hague, the Council of Europe was established, with an intergovernmental Committee of Ministers, a consultative parliamentary assembly composed of delegates from national parliaments, and a European Court of Human Rights. It was the first pan-European organisation, predating the European Union.

In the 1947 essay "Toward European Unity", English writer George Orwell called for the establishment of a Federal Europe under a system of democratic socialism, which he believed could act as a geopolitical counterweight to both the capitalist United States and the communist Soviet Union.

The Union Movement was a British party founded by Oswald Mosley after the dissolution of his British Union of Fascists. Mosley first presented his idea of "Europe a Nation" in his book The Alternative in 1947. He argued that the traditional vision of nationalism that had been followed by the various shades of pre-war fascism had been too narrow in scope and that the post-war era required a new paradigm in which Europe would come together as a single state. In October 1948 when Mosley called for elections to a European Assembly as the first step towards his vision. Nation Europa was a German magazine inspired by Mosley's ideas, founded in 1951 by former SS commander Arthur Ehrhardt and Herbert Boehme with the support of Carl-Ehrenfried Carlberg. Mosley would establish the National Party of Europe and his journal called The European.

By the 1950s and 1960s, Europe saw the emergence of two different projects, the European Free Trade Association and the much more political European Economic Community.

=== Early 21st century ===
Individuals such as the former German Foreign Minister Joschka Fischer have said (in 2000) that he believes that in the end, the EU must become a single federation, with its political leader chosen by direct elections among all of its citizens. However, claims that the then-proposed Treaty of Nice aimed to create a "European superstate" were rejected by former United Kingdom European Commissioner Chris Patten and by many member-state governments. (As of 2023, the post "President of the European Union" does not exist, nor are there any plans of implementation.)

It is to be differentiated from a fused European State, or the concept of a European Republic, equalizing European regions, past the member states, as advocated by Ulrike Guérot.

== Proposals for closer union ==
Countries that could join the European Union: Current members Candidates Applicants Membership possible Countries located (at least partially) in Europe Application rejected by the European Council

The member states of the European Union have many common policies within the EU and on behalf of the EU that are sometimes suggestive of a federal state. It has a common policy-setting body, the European Council (of national Heads of Government) that defines the overall political direction and priorities of the European Union. It has a common executive (the European Commission) to oversee execution of policies and to verify compliance with Treaty obligations, including a single High Representative for the Common Foreign and Security Policy. It has a common European Security and Defence Policy, a single internal market for goods and services, freedom of movement of persons for work, a European citizenship granting European rights, a supreme court (Court of Justice of the European Union – but only in matters of European Union law or areas affected by it), a common bi-cameral legislature in the form of the directly elected European Parliament and the Council of the EU (of national ministers, meeting in formations of specialised ministers for each policy area) representing Member States and which, on most subjects, acts by a (weighted) majority vote. It also has numerous agencies and other bodies to implement European law and coordinate policies such as EUROPOL or the European Environment Agency. European Law also takes precedence over national law in all areas granted to it by member states (but not otherwise), ranging from energy and environmental policy to consumer rights and criminal justice. It has a common currency, the euro used by all but five of its member states while one member country of the European Union (Denmark) has linked its currency to the euro in ERM II. (Non-EU Andorra, Monaco, San Marino, the Vatican City, Kosovo and Montenegro also use the euro.)

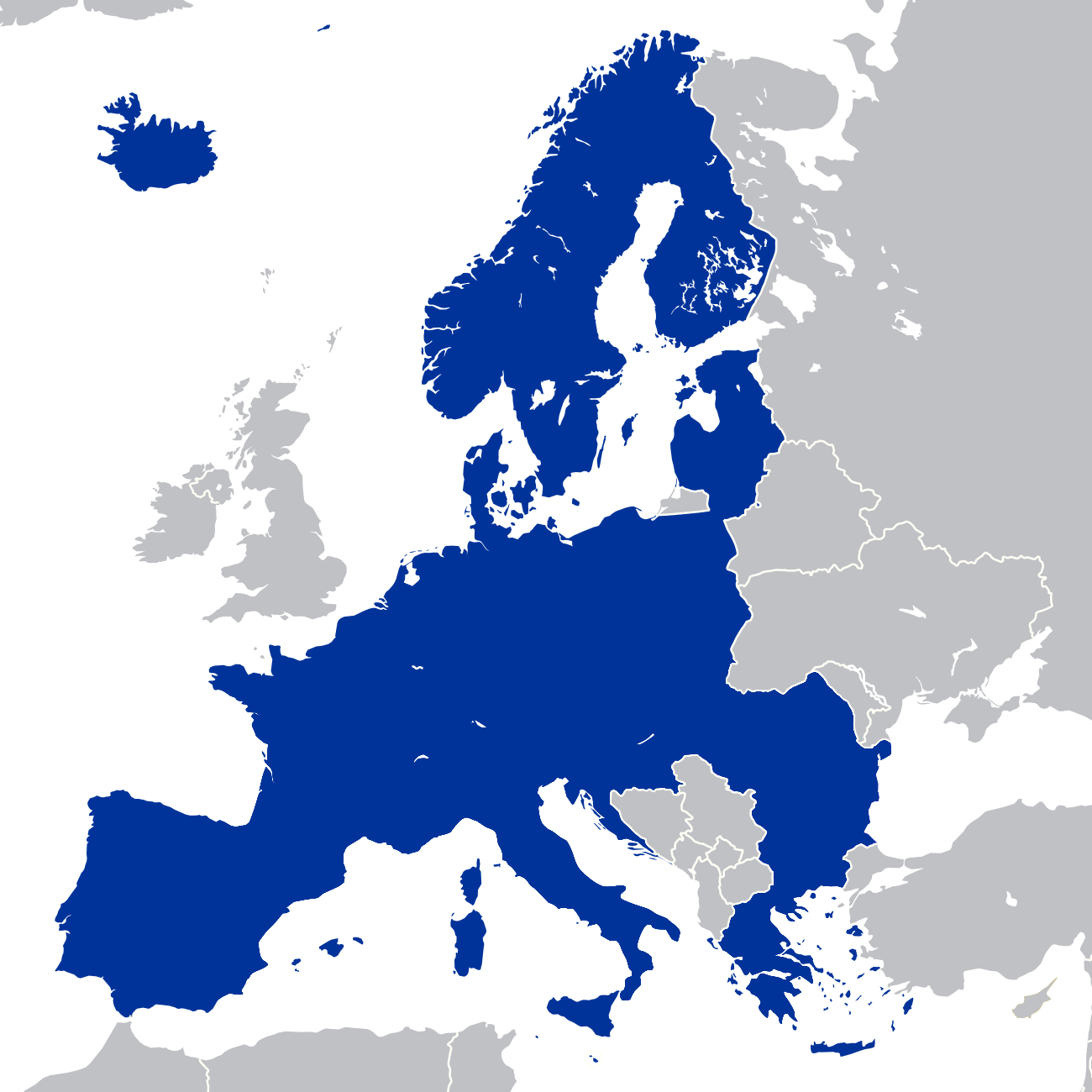
Schengen Area

Eurozone

Several pan-European institutions exist separate from the EU. The European Space Agency counts almost all EU member states in its membership, but it is independent of the EU and its membership includes nations that are not EU members, notably Switzerland, Norway and as a result of Brexit, the United Kingdom. The European Political Community is an annual intergovernmental meeting of 47 European states (all except Russia and Belarus) established in 2022 following the Russian invasion of Ukraine.

At present, the European Union is a free association of sovereign states which is not officially characterised as a federation or as a confederation, even though it has some features of each. Its single market is run along quasi federal lines, whereas on foreign policy and security issues it is an inter-governmental confederation. Other than the vague aim of "ever closer union" in the preamble and Article 1 of the Treaty on European Union, the EU has not defined its future form. However, in the past, many of its "founding fathers" such as Jean Monnet and Robert Schuman did refer to the ultimate ambition of a federal Europe.

In the United States of America, the concept enters serious discussions of whether a unified Europe is feasible and what impact increased European unity would have on the United States of America's relative political and economic power. Glyn Morgan, a Harvard University associate professor of government and social studies, uses it unapologetically in the title of his book The Idea of a European Superstate: Public Justification and European Integration. While Morgan's text focuses on the security implications of a unified Europe, a number of other recent texts focus on the economic implications of such an entity. Important recent texts here include T. R. Reid's The United States of Europe and Jeremy Rifkin's The European Dream. Neither the National Review nor the Chronicle of Higher Education doubt the appropriateness of the term in their reviews.

=== European federalist organisations ===
Various federalist organisations have been created over time supporting the idea of a federal Europe. These include the Union of European Federalists, the European Movement International, the (former) European Federalist Party, Stand Up For Europe and Volt Europa.

==== Union of European Federalists ====
The Union of European Federalists (UEF) is a European non-governmental organisation campaigning for a Federal Europe. It consists of 20 national sections and it has been active at the European, national and local levels for more than 50 years. A youth branch called the Young European Federalists also exists in 30 countries of Europe.

==== European Movement International ====
The European Movement International is a lobbying association that coordinates the efforts of associations and national councils with the goal of promoting European integration, and disseminating information about it.

==== European Federalist Party ====
The European Federalist Party was a pro-European, pan-European and federalist political party from 2011 to 2016 which advocated further integration of the European Union.

==== Stand Up for Europe ====
As the successor movement of the European Federalist Party, Stand Up For Europe is a pan-European NGO that advocates the foundation of a European Federation. Contrary to movements like the UEF or the former EFP, Stand Up for Europe does not command any national levels anymore, but only consists of regional city teams and the European level.

==== Volt Europa ====
Volt Europa describes itself a pan-European, progressive movement that stands for a new and inclusive way of doing politics and that wants to bring change for European citizens. The party claims that a new pan-European approach is needed to overcome current and future challenges, such as – among others – climate change, economic inequality, migration, international conflict, terrorism, and the impact of the technological revolution on jobs. Volt says that national parties are powerless in front of these challenges, because they go beyond national borders and need to be tackled by Europeans, as one people. As a transnational party, it believes it can help the European people unite, create a shared vision and understanding, exchange good practices across the continent, and come up with working policies. Volt Europa is the first European federalist movement to have elected members in two national parliaments, namely in the Netherlands and Bulgaria, as well as having elected five MEPs from Germany and the Netherlands.

=== Politicians ===
==== Guy Verhofstadt ====
Following the negative referendums about the European Constitution in France and the Netherlands, the former Belgian prime minister Guy Verhofstadt released in November 2005 his book, written in Dutch, Verenigde Staten van Europa ("United States of Europe") in which he claims – based on the results of a Eurobarometer questionnaire – that the average European citizen wants more Europe. He thinks a federal Europe should be created between those states that wish to have a federal Europe (as a form of enhanced cooperation). In other words, a core federal Europe would exist within the current EU. He also states that these core states should federalise the following five policy areas: a European social-economic policy, technology cooperation, a common justice and security policy, a common diplomacy and a European army. Following the ratification of the Treaty of Lisbon (December 2009) by all member states of the EU, the outline of a common diplomatic service, known as the External Action Service of the European Union (EEAS), was set in place. On 20 February 2009, the European Parliament also voted in favour of the creation of Synchronised Armed Forces Europe (SAFE) as a first step towards a forming a true European military force.

Verhofstadt's book was awarded the first Europe Book Prize, which is organised by the association Esprit d'Europe and supported by former president of the European Commission Jacques Delors. The prize money was €20,000. The prize was declared at the European Parliament in Brussels on 5 December 2007. Swedish crime fiction writer Henning Mankell was the president of the jury of European journalists for choosing the first recipient.

While receiving the reward, Verhofstadt said: "When I wrote this book, I in fact meant it as a provocation against all those who didn't want the European Constitution. Fortunately, in the end a solution was found with the treaty, that was approved".

==== Viviane Reding ====
In 2012, Viviane Reding, then a Luxembourgish Vice-president of the European Commission called in a speech in Passau, Germany, and in a series of articles and interviews for the establishment of the United States of Europe as a way to strengthen the unity of Europe.

==== Matteo Renzi ====
The Italian Prime Minister Matteo Renzi said in 2014 that under his leadership Italy would use its six-month-long presidency of the European Union to push for the establishment of a United States of Europe.

In 2024, Matteo Renzi, serving as the leader of Italia Viva, and Emma Bonino, head of the More Europe party, formed an electoral list for the 2024 European Parliament election under the name "United States of Europe". Renzi described the initiative as an effort to "bring to Brussels several MEPs who are not sovereignists or populists—people who believe in the United States of Europe. People who do politics." Alongside Italia Viva and More Europe, the list includes the Italian Socialist Party, the Italian Radicals, the European Liberal Democrats and L'Italia c'è.

==== Martin Schulz ====
In December 2017, Martin Schulz, who was then the new leader of the German Social Democratic Party, called for a new constitutional treaty for a "United States of Europe". He proposed that this constitution should be written by "a convention that includes civil society and the people" and that any state that declined to accept this proposed constitution should have to leave the bloc. The Guardian's view was that his proposal was "likely to be met with some resistance from Angela Merkel and other EU leaders". On that day he also stated that he would like to see a "United States of Europe" by 2025.

==== Silvio Berlusconi ====
The former Italian Prime Minister Silvio Berlusconi repeatedly expressed support for deeper European integration under the banner of a “United States of Europe.”

In a November 2019 address to the European People's Party in Zagreb, he argued that “unificare le Forze armate di tutti gli Stati” (“unifying the armed forces of all Member States”) was imperative for the EU to matter on the world stage, adding that it would also serve as a deterrent to large-scale migration and maintain strategic parity with global powers such as the United States, Russia, and China. On multiple occasions, he further urged amending the EU treaties to enable majority decision-making, contending that the unanimity rule often hindered rapid and decisive EU-level action.<

Berlusconi's stance on the euro and European integration was more ambivalent in a 2014 interview with the BBC Newsnight. Warning that “the economic situation will force us and other European countries to abandon the euro and go back to their national currencies” without “radical changes,” he said the EU was “far from ever becoming a United States of Europe” due to what he called “very imbalanced economic” and “very imbalanced tax” policies, as well as the absence of a coherent foreign policy.

=== Notable individuals ===
==== Freddy Heineken ====
In 1992, Dutch businessman Freddy Heineken, after consulting with historians of the University of Leiden, Henk Wesseling and Willem van den Doel published a brochure "United States of Europe, Eurotopia?". In his work he put forward the idea of creating the United States of Europe as a confederation of 75 states that would be formed according to an ethnic and linguistic principle with a population of 5 to 10 million people.

== Predictions ==
De jure status of possible future enlargement of the European Union: Current member states Former member state which has withdrawn from the EU: United Kingdom Candidates: Albania, Bosnia and Herzegovina, Georgia, North Macedonia, Moldova, Montenegro, Serbia, Turkey and Ukraine Potential candidates that have applied for membership: Kosovo* (status disputed). States that have withdrawn their applications: Iceland, Norway, Switzerland

=== Future superpower ===
Some people, such as T. R. Reid, Andrew Reding and Mark Leonard, have argued that the power of a hypothetical United States of Europe could potentially rival that of the United States of America in the twenty-first century. Leonard cites several factors: Europe's large population, the scale of the combined Europe's economy, Europe's low inflation rates, Europe's central geographic location in the world's landmasses, and certain European countries' relatively highly developed social organisation and quality of life (when measured in terms such as hours worked per week and income distribution). Some experts claim that Europe has developed a sphere of influence called the "Eurosphere". Assumptions about a potential full or near superpower status of a perceived supranational Euro state are hypothetical in nature. On the other hand, contrary notions and arguments exist across a wide spectrum among analysts, experts and pundits.

=== Scepticisms ===
Some people think that the European Union is unlikely to evolve into a unified federal superstate, due to political opposition of some members. Norwegian foreign policy scholar and commentator Asle Toje has argued that the power and reach of the European Union more closely resembles a small power. In his book The EU As a Small Power, he argues that the EU is a response to and function of Europe's unique historical experience in that the EU contains the remnants of not one but five past European orders. Although the 1990s and early 2000s have shown that there is policy space for greater EU engagement in European security, the EU has been unable to meet these expectations.

Asle Toje expresses particular concerns over the EU's security and defence dimension Common Security and Defence Policy, where attempts at pooling resources and forming a political consensus have failed to generate the results expected. These trends, combined with shifts in global power patterns, are seen to have been accompanied by a shift in EU strategic thinking whereby great power ambitions have been scaled down and replaced by a tendency towards hedging vis-à-vis the great powers. The author uses the case of the EUFOR intervention in Darfur and Chad to illustrate that the EU's effectiveness is hampered by a consensus–expectations gap, owing primarily to the lack of an effective decision-making mechanism. In his view, the sum of these developments is that the EU – in the current situation – will not be a great power and is taking the place of a small power in the emerging multi-polar international order.

=== Polls ===
Attitude toward further development of the EU into a federation of nation states according to the Eurobarometer Poll of spring 2014: EU members with more people in favour of a federation than against it EU members (including at the time the UK) and Greenland with more people against a federation than in favour of it

According to Eurobarometer (2013), 69% of citizens of the EU were in favour of direct elections of the president of the European Commission and 46% support the creation of a united EU army.

Two thirds of respondents think that the EU (instead of a national government alone) should make decisions on foreign policy, and more than half of respondents think that the EU should also make decisions on defence.

44% of respondents support the future development of the European Union as a federation of nation states, 35% are opposed. The Nordic countries were the most negative towards a united Europe in this study, as 73% of the Nordics opposed the idea. A large majority of the people for whom the EU conjures up a positive image support the further development of the EU into a federation of nation states (56% versus 27%).

== Fiction ==
In The Old Earth, the third volume (1911) of Jerzy Żuławski's The Lunar Trilogy, the USE is a communist state.

In the fictional universe of Eric Flint's best selling alternate history 1632 series, a United States of Europe is formed out of the Confederation of Principalities of Europe, which was composed of several German political units of the 1630s.

Science fiction has made particular use of the idea: Incompetence, a dystopian novel by Red Dwarf creator Rob Grant, is a murder mystery political thriller set in a federated Europe of the near future, where stupidity is a constitutionally protected right. References to a European Alliance or European Hegemony have also existed in episodes of Star Trek: The Next Generation (1987–1994). In the Spy High series of books for young adults, written by A. J. Butcher and set around the 2060s, a united Europe exists in the form of "Europa", and Andrew Roberts's 1995 book The Aachen Memorandum details a United States of Europe formed from a fraudulent referendum entitled the Aachen Referendum.

Since the 2000s a number of computer strategy games set in the future have presented a unified European faction alongside other established military powers such as the United States and Russia. These include Euro Force (a 2006 expansion pack to Battlefield 2) and Battlefield 2142 (also released in 2006, with a 2007 expansion pack). In Battlefield 2142 a united Europe is shown as one of the two great superpowers on Earth, the other being Asia, despite being mostly frozen in a new ice age. The disaster theme continues with Tom Clancy's EndWar (2009), in which a nuclear war between Iran and Saudi Arabia, destroying the Middle Eastern oil supply, prompts the EU to integrate further as the "European Federation" in 2018. One game not to make bold claims of full integration is Shattered Union (2005), set in a future civil war in the United States, with the EU portrayed as a peacekeeping force. The video game series Wipeout instead makes a clear federal reference without a military element: one of the core teams that has appeared in every game is FEISAR. This acronym stands for Federal European Industrial Science and Research. In the video game series Mass Effect set in the 22nd century, the European Union is a sovereign state.

In the backstory of the Fallout series, several European nations joined after the end of the Second World War, becoming known as the European Commonwealth. Heavily dependent on oil imports from the Middle East, the Commonwealth began a military invasion of the region in April 2052 once oil supplies began to run dry. This marked the beginning of the Resource Wars. After the oil dried up completely in 2060 and both sides were left in ruins, the Commonwealth collapsed into civil war as member states fought over whatever resources remained. It is not specified whether the European Commonwealth is a single federated nation or just an economic bloc similar to the EU.

In the anime series Code Geass, the EU (short for Euro Universe or Europia United), also known as the United Republic of Europia, is one of the three superpowers that dominate the Earth militarily, politically, culturally and economically. The political worldbuilding of the series partially resembles that of George Orwell's Nineteen-Eighty-Four, with three superstates in roughly the same geographic positions controlling the world. Gundam 00 anime series featured the Advanced European Union (AEU) as one of the major power blocs while in Gundam SEED the Eurasian Union includes both European Union and post-Soviet states.

== See also ==
- American Committee on United Europe – Public/private US organization promoting European federalism
- Brand EU – Private pro-EU organization
- Captain Euro – Comics character
- Centre Virtuel de la Connaissance sur l'Europe – Research organisation maintaining a digital library on European integration
- Constituent state – Member of a [con]federation
- Decentralization – Organizational theory
- Devolution – Granting of some competences of central government to local government
- Europe a Nation – Ideology developed by Oswald Mosley
- European Civil War – Concept describing 19th and 20th century conflicts in Europe as one continuous civil war
- Eurocentrism – Worldview centred on or biased towards Western civilization
- Euroscepticism – Body of criticism of the European Union
- Fourth Reich – Hypothetical successor of Nazi Germany
- Institutions of the European Union – Decision-making bodies of the European Union
- Multi-speed Europe – Political idea
- New England Confederation – 1643–1686 colonial alliance
- Pan-European identity – Personal identification with Europe
- Pan-European nationalism – Far-right ultra-nationalism
- Paneuropean Union – Oldest European unification movement
- Pan-nationalism – Nationalism beyond national boundaries
- Potential Superpower (European Union) – Globally dominant political entity
- Pro-Europeanism – Favouring European integration
- Subsidiarity (European Union) – Principle of governance of the European Union
- United States of Africa – Political concept similar to the hypothesised United States of Europe
- United States of Latin Africa – Proposed union of Romance-language-speaking Central African countries
- World government – Notion of a single common political authority for all of humanity

== Notes ==
=== Sources ===
- Dinan, Desmond (2005). Ever Closer Union: an introduction to European integration (3rd ed.). Palgrave Macmillan. ISBN 978-0-333-96171-1.
