= European Federalist Party =

French political party and former European political alliance

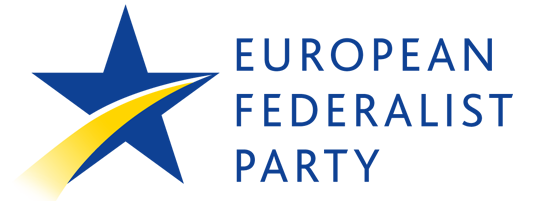
- President: Yves Gernigon
- General Secretary: Jean-Jacques Page
- Treasurer: Jean-Paul Bernard
- Founded: 6 November 2011
- Headquarters: Paris, France
- Ideology: European federalism
- Colours: Yellow and Blue

Website
- www.eurofederalistparty.eu

The European Federalist Party (abbreviated as PFE in French, EFP in English) is a French political party and was, before its 2016 break-up, a European political alliance founded on 6 November 2011 in Paris. The EFP is one of the first European-oriented political parties that openly defends European federalism and is not a coalition of pre-existing national parties.

The European Federalist Party is made up of members from 12 European countries, from civil society, who face their professional life and political commitment.

== History ==
EFP is the result of the reunification of Europe United, which was founded in 2005 and had a presence in several countries of the European Union, and the French Parti fédéraliste.

In 2016, the office was composed of President Pietro De Matteis, Vice President Geogios Kostakos, Secretary General Emmanuel Rodary, Treasurer Mariarosaria Marziali, John Retetagos, Marco Marazzi and Michel Caillouet. Following the general assembly of 6 December 2016, the office of the European Federalist Party merged with the citizen movements Stand-up for the United States of Europe and USE Now to create Stand Up For Europe. On the other hand, the French and other national associations composing the EFP decided to continue its political action as European Federalist Party.

== Political project ==
The goal of the European Federalist Party is to create a European Federation of voluntary member states of the European Union. It aims to present candidates at all elections across Europe. It was initially supported by prominent European personalities, such as Marco Pannella (former MEP, deputy, Italian senator and collaborator of Altiero Spinelli), who was one of the founding members.

The members of the PFE campaign for the creation of a supranational European State with limited sovereign powers and political institutions: government, assembly, federal Senate representing the Member States.

=== Main proposals ===
As the name suggests, the party's goal is to make the European Union a true federal state. This project can be possibly carried out starting with a nucleus of volunteer countries members of the Euro area. That implies:

- Establish a federal Constitution in place of the many current treaties;
- Elect a federal president by direct universal suffrage to represent the federation internationally. It will be the guarantor of its constitution, and would exercise the powers of the European Council;
- Make the European Commission a true federal government;
- Strengthen the powers of the European Parliament: the vote must be regionalised in order to bring the Members of the European Parliament (MEP) closer to their constituents, while the Council of the European Union must be replaced by a real "European Senate" (upper house), with a view to a bicameral system;
- Deepen the Court of Justice of the European Union into a real Supreme Court;
- Strengthen the powers of the European Central Bank in order to allow it to deal with financial crises;
- Create a European Headquarters responsible for the European Common Army;
- Deepen European citizenship to make it a true nationality, independently from the national citizenship;
- Define a common European foreign and diplomatic policy to better defend European interests vis-à-vis other major powers (notably the United States of America and China);
- Create a European budget to finance major projects and create jobs throughout Europe;
- Establish European independent control authorities in the areas of environment, health security and bioethics;
- Countries wishing to join the Federal Union will have to adopt the European Constitution to maintain a certain coherence in its functioning. This does not exclude the possibility of cooperation agreements with privileged partners.

=== The EFP and the European Union ===
The EFP argues that most of the ills in the European Union today come from the past and from the shortcomings of an institutional scheme that was completed by the crisis. The European Federalist Party proposes to go beyond the current Union, which according to that party is "bureaucratic and un-democratic". Thus the federal Europe desired by the EFP is different from the current European Union, which is see as not strong enough to defend European interests, and too far from the concerns of citizens.

== Political strategy ==
The European Federalist Party, like the federalist model, leaves a great deal of autonomy to its national sections, which have a certain freedom of adaptation of the European program to the local culture. On the other hand, the European program whose primary goal is to build a European federation is common. The EFP thus seeks to differentiate itself from the current official formations of the European Parliament by proposing cohesion on the European level. The announced goal is to create a mass popular movement around the party and the idea of a federal Europe to respond to the current crisis. The European Federalist Party has participated in numerous elections, including the French presidential election and the European elections.

== See also ==
- Federalisation of the European Union
- United States of Europe
- Volt Europa
