= Cécil von Renthe-Fink =

German diplomat

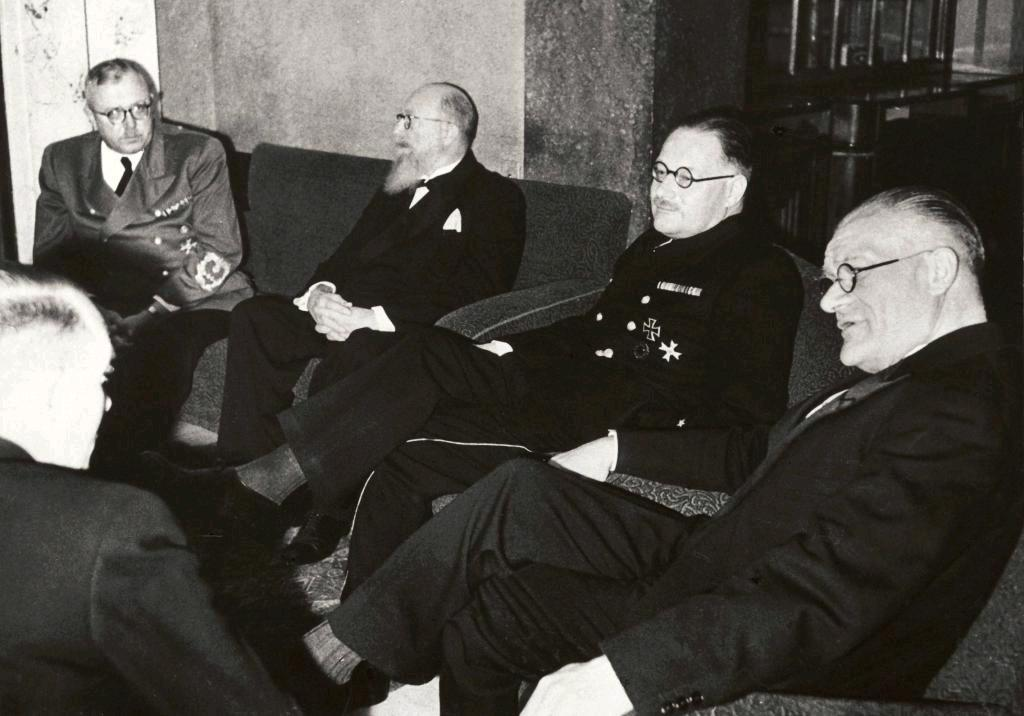
Renthe-Fink (second from right) at a meeting of the Danish-German Association, 1941

Cécil Karl-August Timon Ernst Anton von Renthe-Fink (1885 Breslau, Silesia Province, German Empire–1964 Munich, West Germany) was a diplomat for Nazi Germany, who served as Plenipotentiary of Denmark from 9 April 1940 until 1942.

In 1926, Cécil von Renthe-Fink was posted to Dresden as Joint Secretary of the International Elbe Commission. This Commission had been set up by the League of Nations to ensure that the Elbe was kept as a free outlet to the North Sea for shipping from Czechoslovakia. (Note: Arthur Kingscote Potter's autobiography and letters lodged at the British Library)

He was appointed envoy to Denmark in 1936. In 1939 he became a member of the Nazi Party. After the occupation of Denmark he became Plenipotentiary (Reichsbevollmächtigter). In 1942, he was replaced by Dr. Werner Best after the Telegram Crisis, as Berlin was looking for a harder response to Denmark.

In 1943, Renthe-Fink was posted to Vichy France. In that year, the German ministers Joachim von Ribbentrop and Renthe-Fink proposed the creation of a European Confederation, which would have had a single currency, a central bank in Berlin, a regional principle, a labour policy, and economic and trading agreements.

He was married to Countess Christa Vitzthum von Eckstädt, daughter of Count Christoph Vitzthum von Eckstädt, who had been the Chief Minister of the Kingdom of Saxony.
