= Capability–expectations gap =

In 1993, Christopher Hill published an influential article on what he called Europe's "capability–expectations gap." In it, he analysed the international role of the European Communities (EC) and identified a gap between what it had been talked up to do and what the EC was actually able to deliver. He saw the capability–expectations gap as having three primary components, namely, the ability to agree, resource availability, and the instruments at the European Communities' disposal. Hill took a pragmatic approach, choosing to conceptualize the patterns of activity – as opposed to the more ambitious task of theorizing Europe's international role. Leapfrogging questions of theoretical perspective and actorness, Hill directed the reader's attention to a gap between what the EC had been talked up to do and what it was able to deliver in terms of foreign policies, thereby sketching "a more realistic picture of what the Community ... does in the world." Hill argued that if the gap is to be closed, the notion of a European foreign policy must be grounded in demonstrated behaviour rather than potential and aspirations. For this, the EU will require credible capabilities. It is not sufficient to simply amass the power tools: the political unit must also possess the institutions to mobilize them and the decisionmaking mechanisms to command them. The alternative is to simply lower expectations. Over time, Hill's analysis has inspired a great many scholars making 'the capability–expectations gap' a staple of European Studies, a sub-discipline of International Relations.
