= Federalist Party (France) =

French political party

The Federalist Party (Parti fédéraliste, PF) was a French European federalist political party, founded in 1995 by Jean-Philippe Allenbach. In 2011 it joined forces with the Europe United Party and became the European Federalist Party. The French section European Federalist Party is currently led by Yves Gernigon.

The party ran in the 2004 regional elections, running lists in four regions. In Ile-de-France, it won 2.51% in association with Ecology Generation. In 1998 regional elections its lists had obtained between 0.52 and 3.87 percent. In the 2004 EU Parliamentary elections it ran lists in all eight constituencies, with its best results coming from East France and Île-de-France with 0.02% in each of the regions.

After failing to gather the required 500 endorsements to run, Christian Chavrier, the leader of Federalist Party in 2007, endorsed the Union for French Democracy (UDF) candidate François Bayrou in the 2007 presidential election.

== See also ==
- Politics of France
- List of political parties in France
