= European Confederation =

German Foreign Ministry proposal for European integration

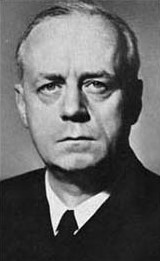
Joachim von Ribbentrop during the Nuremberg Trials

The European Confederation (German: Europäischer Staatenbund) was a proposed political institution of European unity, which was to be part of a broader restructuring (Neuordnung) in the aftermath of a German victory in the Second World War. The plan was proposed by German Foreign Minister Joachim von Ribbentrop in March 1943.

Some historians have argued that the concept was primarily a propaganda tool. However, others have argued that there was genuine enthusiasm for European unity among Nazi and Fascist political leaders and intellectuals since references to the concept were made in secret government memoranda and conversations.

== Background ==
Some in the German Foreign Ministry were interested in the "European question" and collaborated with the Auslandswissenschaftliches Institut (DAWI; German Institute for Foreign Studies) on securing a decision on the matter. Influential Europe planners were Werner Daitz, Franz Six and Karl Megerle, who presented papers and studies on the intellectual foundations of a united Europe under Nazi German leadership.

After several preliminary studies and drafts, a memorandum was submitted in March 1943, which outlined the steps that would be needed to formalize the Confederation. On April 5, 1943, Ribbentrop issued instructions for the establishment of a "European Committee" (German: Europa-Ausschuß) of 14 diplomats in the German Foreign Ministry, which had the task of "the collection of material and the preparation of data to be used for the future settlement of the New European Order after the war has ended".

== Planning ==
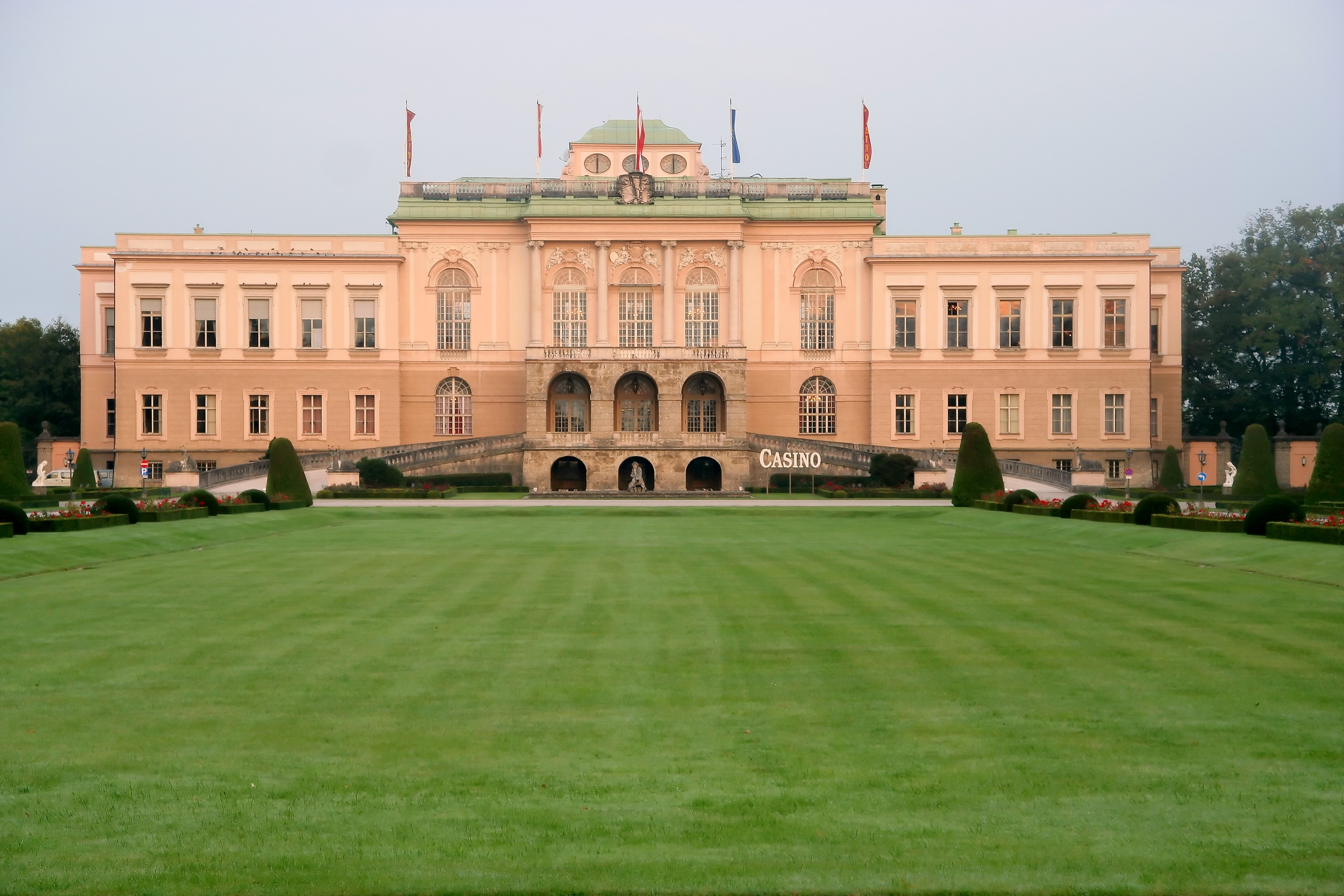
Klessheim Palace, Salzburg

Ribbentrop envisioned that as soon as Germany had gained the significant military victory, the heads of states who were concerned would be invited to a safe meeting place, away from the reach of Allied bombers, such as Salzburg (perhaps at Klessheim Palace) or Vienna, where the instrument for bringing the European Confederation into being would be solemnly signed. The states in question were Germany, Italy, France, Denmark, Norway, Finland, Slovakia, Hungary, Romania, Bulgaria, Croatia, Serbia and Greece. Spain's participation was anticipated but uncertain in the view of the Spanish neutrality in the war. The March 1943 memorandum stated that if any other states were established in territories occupied by Germany, they, too, would be invited to join. Sweden, Switzerland and Portugal were not expected to join as long as the war continued, but their membership was not seen as being of great importance.

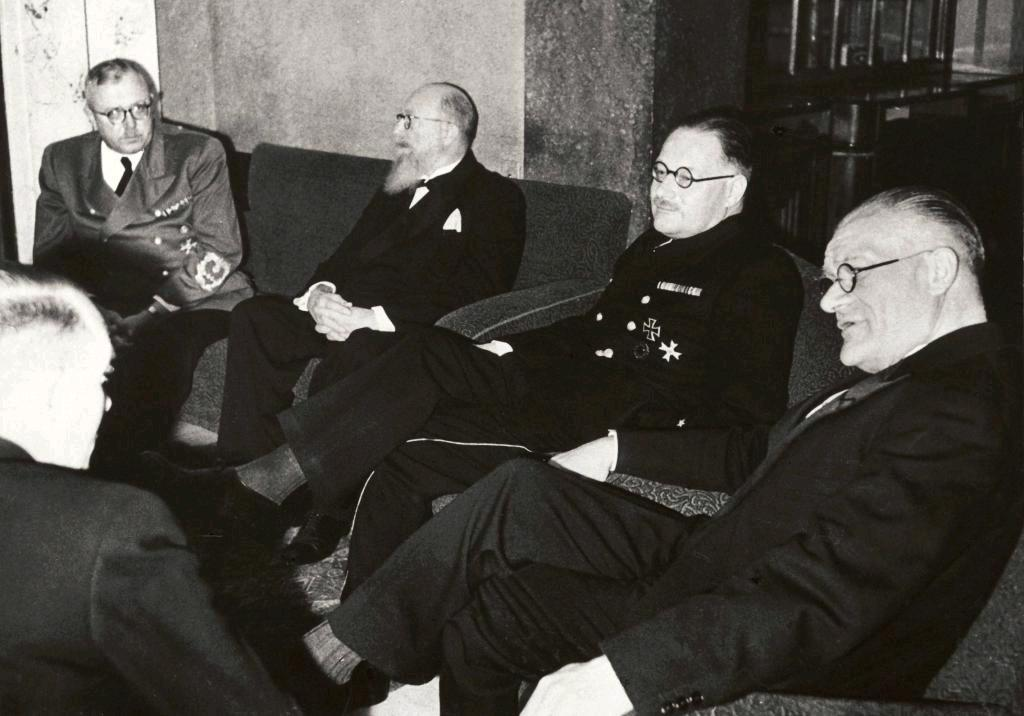
Cécil von Renthe-Fink (third from left) in 1941

The diplomat Cécil von Renthe-Fink submitted a draft to Ribbentrop that also discussed the possibility of Lithuania, Latvia, Estonia, Belgium, the Netherlands and even Russia (under the rule of Vlasov's movement) joining the Confederation. The draft also mentioned that the admission of countries that were projected to be annexed by Greater Germany would not incite those countries towards nationalism, but would be the first step in drawing them into Germany's political sphere (see Greater Germanic Reich). Poland's admission to the Confederation was, according to Renthe-Fink, out of the question.

The draft of the Act stated that the Confederation's purpose was to ensure that wars never again break between European peoples. Its members were to be sovereign states that guaranteed the freedom, the national character and the political independence of other member states.

The organisation of the internal affairs of each member state was to be its respective sovereign decision. The member states were to defend the interests of Europe and protect the Continent from external enemies. European economy was to be reorganised in mutual agreement between the member states, with internal custom and other barriers progressively abolished. Also, trans-European rail, autobahn, waterway and airline networks were all to be developed according to a common plan.

The Confederation was to be partly based on earlier diplomatic treaties signed between the Axis powers: the Italian-German Pact of Steel, the Tripartite Pact and the Anti-Comintern Pact.

The questions of potential territorial adjustments, such as Banat, the Hungarian-Romanian border and Italy's claims to French territory, were to be dealt with, not in the Act of the Confederation, but in separate final peace settlements.

== Goals ==
The project's goals were assuring Germany's allies that their independence would be respected after the war, giving the impression to the Allies that Europe was united in defying them and portraying the Allies as fighting not for the liberation of European states but against the unification of the European continent. That was hoped to neuter Western Allied propaganda against Germany.

A clear call for the Confederation would also allow the Germans to recruit more men for the Waffen-SS from the occupied countries and to force them to bolster their war effort in the personal and material spheres. Also, the Confederation would deter the neutral countries of Europe from joining the Allied powers.

== Reception by Vichy France ==
Vichy French Prime Minister Pierre Laval was enthusiastic about the proposal and wrote in a document to Adolf Hitler that France was ready for territorial sacrifices in Tunisia and Alsace-Lorraine to bring about an "atmosphere of confidence" in Europe. He also stated that France must prepare to join the customs union, and was ready to accept long-term German military occupation of the French Atlantic Coast if it was necessary for the protection of Continental Europe. He also hoped that the measures would not exclude Germany and Italy later allowing France to regain "a position appropriate to its continental and colonial past".

== Rejection by Hitler ==
Hitler was dismissive of the plan, as his vision of postwar Europe was one of total German hegemony. Ernst von Weizsäcker, Secretary of State at the Foreign Office, recorded in his diaries Hitler's position on the matter. On April 13, 1943, Weizsäcker wrote,

"Reorganization of Europe: no enthusiasm for this idea on our side; the present jejune communiqué is a compromise between two parties".

On May 5, 1943, he wrote,

"The reason why we are not to be drawn into a conversation about the "New Order" in Europe is indicated confidentially by the Führer: our neighbours are all our enemies; we must get all we can out of them, but cannot and must not promise them anything".

== See also ==
- Fortress Europe
- German-occupied Europe
- Greater East Asia Co-Prosperity Sphere
- Ideas of European unity before 1945
- United States of Europe

== Sources ==
- Baudet, Thierry (2012). The Significance of Borders: Why Representative Government and the Rule of Law require Nation States. Martinus Nijhoff Publishers. ISBN 978-9004228085.
- Lipgens, Walter; Loth, Wilfried (1985). Documents on the History of European Integration: Continental plans for European union, 1939–1945 (including 250 documents in their original languages on 6 microfiches). Walter de Gruyter. ISBN 978-3110097245.
