= Europa (currency) =

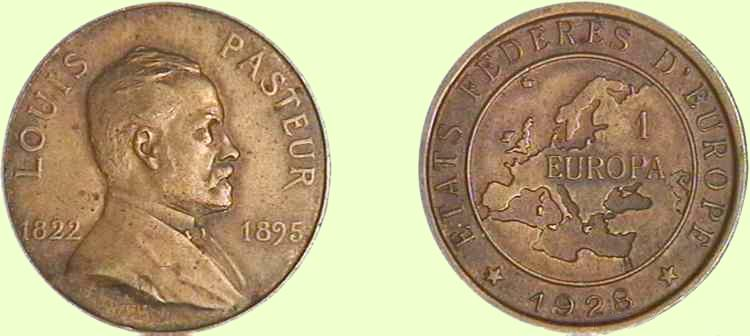
A one-Europa coin

The europa was a private coinage created in 1928 by Joseph Archer, a politician and industrialist, on behalf of a hypothetical "Federated States of Europe" (États fédérés d'Europe). It never circulated in any official capacity exempt privately among members of the European federalist movement in Archer's home region of the Nièvre in France.

Archer's token currency was promoted by Philibert Besson, the elected deputy for the Haute-Loire who, like with Archer, was a European federalist. Unlike contemporary currencies based on the gold standard, the europa was intended to derive its notional value from its value in labour.

Two denominations were produced, both depicting the scientist Louis Pasteur (1822-1895) and a map of Europe on the obverse and reverse respectively: one valued at 1 europa and another at 1/10 of a europa.
