= Spy High =

Book series by A. J. Butcher

- Cover for The Frankenstein Factory
- Author: A. J. Butcher
- Original title: Spy High Series
- Illustrator: Lee Gibbons
- Cover artist: Lee Gibbons
- Language: English
- Series: Spy High
- Genre: Children's, Thriller, Spy novel
- Publisher: Atom Books
- Publication date: 2003
- Publication place: United Kingdom
- Media type: Print (hardback and paperback)

Spy High is an English book series by English writer A. J. Butcher about a high school for secret agents in training. It is divided into two series of six books each. Series One, first published in 2003 and 2004, is about Bond Team as a whole. Series Two, first published in 2004 and 2005, follows each member of Bond Team on a mission, taking place two years after graduation.

A reviewer for The Nelson Mail called the series "high-action, tongue-in-cheek stor(ies) from an Ian Fleming of the next generation," writing that the "characters and locations are classic Bond - casinos, dashing love interests, tropical islands, and nerdy tech-heads loaded down with gadgets. There's style, one-liners, and enough action to keep younger readers turning the pages. Ben Howey, book reviewer for the Evening Chronicle, describes the series as "very definitely the best books for 13-plus readers, all about a group of teenagers who just happen to be spies like James Bond.... powered by suspense and there's lots of humour too with funny characters, lots of one-line jokes and exciting gadgets."

Only the first five books of Series One are released in the United States, although the sixth was scheduled and pulled prior to publication. Series one and series two have been released in the United Kingdom.

== Series one ==
=== The Frankenstein Factory ===
They can hack any computer, break any algorithm, take out bad guys with SleepShot from two hundred metres, and vanish utterly without trace. The one thing Bond Team haven't got their heads round is, er, bonding. Jake and Ben want to kill each other, Jen thinks Lori is an airhead bimbo, and the only thing Eddie respects about Cally is her butt. All this is very bad news. Because if they don't get it together for their first term exams, if they can't defeat the infamous Stromfeld Program, then they can forget about ever graduating Spy High. And with a mind-wipe greeting all those who flunk out, we mean that quite literally.

=== The Chaos Connection (US: Chaos Rising) ===
Bond Team are back, and preparing to battle for the prestigious Sherlock Shield. Victory means a place in the Deveraux College hall of fame. But to win, they'll have to beat their arch-rivals – and Solo Team is prepared to do anything to stop that from happening. Bond Team will have to watch their backs. And maybe everywhere else too, because in the world outside of Spy High, a terrorist organisation is about to send its first explosive announcement: Chaos is coming!

=== The Serpent Scenario ===
There's a deadly new drug on the streets of America. Drac is instantly and horribly addictive and turns its users into zombies with a desperate craving for blood. Every agent from Spy High has been assigned to discover its source – even the trainees.

But one member of Bond Team won't be joining the hunt. Jennifer Chen is following a dangerous trail of her own. She's got some private business with a street gang called the Serpents. And it's a business of revenge.

=== The Paranoia Plot ===
Rebecca Dee has spiked green hair, a lot of body piercings and even more attitude. But that's not what's bothering Jake, Cally and the others. They're more worried about the 'accidents' that seem to happen whenever their new team mate is around. And about where she keeps sneaking off to late at night. Because with strange and dangerous events unfolding in the world outside Spy High, her unusual behaviour is looking like more than just coincidence. In fact, Bond Team are beginning to suspect that Rebecca Dee is a double-agent....

=== The Soul Stealer (US: Blood Relations) ===
Things are not looking good for Benjamin T. Stanton Jr. His grades are dropping, his relationship with Lori has hit a major low, and his leadership of Bond Team is in serious doubt. If Ben can't pull things around, he's in real danger of flunking his Spy High exams. And that means one thing – Mind-wipe. Ben is desperate for the chance to prove himself in a mission situation, but then Bond Team become embroiled in the investigation of a sinister cult and he suddenly wishes he could be anywhere but Spy High. Because this time the suspects aren't just random terrorists, or crazed megalomaniacs – they include members of Benjamin T. Stanton Junior's own family.

=== The Annihilation Agenda ===
Bond Team have a LOT on their minds. Not only are they about to get their exam results, they're also caught up in Spy High's investigations into terrorism at the Solartech power plant. And while Lori, Jake and the others may be freaking out about the exams, their discoveries at Solartech are way more worrying. Because Bond Team have uncovered a plot that's going to make those exam results seem pretty irrelevant. Because humanity is about to be wiped out, and there's nothing anyone can do to stop it.

== Series two ==
=== Edward Red ===
Eddie Nelligan is an Irish boy with red hair. The only thing he is good at is making jokes, trying to flirt with all the girls on his team, and sky biking. He is known to be the best in the history of Spy High. He is posted in London, and soon starts facing the threat of a huge terrorist attack poised to stop Britain from joining Europa, a group of European countries.

=== Angel Blue ===
Lori Angel is a graduate of the Deveraux College, the highly secret school for teenage spies. She is the former girlfriend of Ben Stanton. Until now she has been posted on the coast, mostly surfing and partying. But then a fellow graduate turns up at her apartment. Dead. Stashed in his rucksack are a series of clues that will lead Lori into the most dangerous situation of her life. And into conflict with a secret society, every member of which is supposed to be dead.

=== Benjamin White ===
Benjamin Stanton Jr. is a graduate of the Deveraux College, the highly secret school for teenage spies. His old girlfriend is Lori Angel. When Spy High's old enemy, President Vlad Tepesch of Wallachia, steals an alien device from a Deveraux Moon Colony, Ben's mission is pretty straightforward: Get it back. Standing between Ben and his goal are enemy soldiers, ferocious vampires, a jealous rival, and a singularly disturbing prophecy. Clearly this won't be as easy as it sounds. Bond Team has already lost one member to the Wallachian president – could Benjamin Stanton be next?

=== Calista Green ===
Orphaned computer expert Calista Cross is a graduate of the Deveraux College, the highly secret school for teenage spies. And at the moment, she's not coping. Recent events have hit her hard and she's so unfocused that she's in danger of being mind-wiped and expelled by the Deveraux organisation. What Cally needs is some action, and a new case involving the suspicious deaths of several nanotech specialists seems just the thing. But an anonymous email hinting that Cally could be close to finding out about her parents, turns the case from professional to very, very personal. And more than one surprise is waiting for her.

=== Jake Black ===
Disillusioned with Spy High's methods, Jake chooses to join the Deveraux organisation's secretive Black Ops Division, where the rules don't matter as long as you get the job done. Now, the newly authorised Jake Black must infiltrate a group of apocalyptic terrorists and shut down their mad scheme to destroy the Earth. But Jake's about to find out that if you fight fire with fire, sooner or later you're going to get burned...

=== Agent Orange ===
When Rebecca (Bex) Deveraux's father – the lord and master of Spy High – sends her friend for mind-wiping, Bex realises her dad may be becoming just what his institution was created to counter: a raging megalomaniac! He's sending more and more spies on suspect missions and he's increased the armaments at Spy High threefold. Worse, Bex has discovered plans that suggest her dear old dad is building a vast mechanoid army. And she's fairly sure he won't be employing them to tend the grounds at Spy High.

== Teams ==
Bond Team is the team in which all the main characters reside, however there are four teams: Bond, Solo, Hannay, and Palmer, all named after fictional spies – James Bond, Napoleon Solo, Richard Hannay and Harry Palmer respectively.

=== Bond Team of 2064 ===
Hand-picked by Senior Tutor Elmore Grant.

==== Benjamin T. Stanton Jr. ====
Codename: Benjamin White--Region White

Benjamin Tiberius Stanton III is the blue eyed and cocky leader of Bond Team. He has short cropped blonde hair, and was born in the United States to the wealthy Ben and Nancy Stanton, with no mentioned siblings. He is the heir to the Stanton fortune, which makes its money in a law firm, as referenced in Benjamin White. His birthday party is in the final term (Soul Stealer is set entirely in the final term), and his birthday is 1 August.

He has the highest aggregate score since the advent of the college, and is Best in School after examinations. He remained Team Leader until midway through Soul Stealer, when he fought with rival Jake Daly. He has had relationships with Lori Angel (books 1–5) and Calista Cross (books 6-end). In the first book, he voted for Eddie Nelligan as Team Leader partly as a joke, because Eddie was apparently an unfit leader and Ben could not vote for himself. Later, after losing leadership, he votes for his ex-girlfriend, Lori.

His region, white, extends from Eastern Europa all the way to the shores of the Pacific and includes some former Soviet satellites. His field handler and cover identity remain unmentioned. He is based in New Moscow and is assigned to recover an Alien Device from Vlad Tepesch, who used minions to steal it from the moon as a weapon against the Western Powers. His mission objective is to get rid of the starstone, not to get rid of Tepesch, though he ends up resolving to do so anyway after witnessing how Wallachia is ruled by fear and oppression. He fails to save EXIST member Tolly Porter from suffocating after he runs out of oxygen. (EXIST is a Deveraux suborganisation created after the Diluvian incident, which specialises in examining extra terrestrial threats.)

He is known for getting at least one line in all 12 Spy High books. His solo novel, Benjamin White, is the third in Series Two. Ben is absorbed into the Starstone as alternative energy in Benjamin White. He returns in Calista Green thanks to cyborg Adam Thornchild's matter converter machine. In Agent Orange, he is the joint-last to be pixellated and deleted from the system along with Jake. They were on the stairs going to Deveraux's rooms, and a laser bolt scorches his leg at the same time a shock blast nicks Jake's arm. They charge Deveraux's hordes as they become pixellated to give Bex more time...but not before their differences are resolved.

Ben is focused, determined, and smart. He is fiercely competitive and at times arrogant, though this changes after The Soul Stealer (Blood Relations in the US).

==== Lori Angel ====
Codename: Angel Blue--Region Blue

Lori Angel has no known middle name, and has long blonde hair and blue eyes. Her parents' names are unknown, but she has a steady family according to an interview with author A.J. Butcher . She has no known siblings. Lori's birthday is never mentioned in the book, although it is listed on the website as 3 January. The website also says that she is Canadian, but the books never reference this. Lori has the second highest aggregate score in the history of the college and passes her examinations, probably second to Ben in results.

Lori is team leader for the second half of Soul Stealer, the entirety of Annihlation Agenda and the entirety of Series Two where it is applicable. Her region, Blue, is on the West Coast of the United States and presumably some parts of South America. Her field handler is called Luanne "Shades" Carmody. Luanne has substitute eyes – one functions as a computer and radar, the other fires laser bolts. Lori's cover job is both a dance instructor and partying surfer girl. She is based in Los Angeles. Her assignment is to prevent an assassination on President Graveney Westwood orchestrated by the Judson siblings, who are instrumental in worldwide Arms manufacture and are also very wealthy. Nobody dies on her watch, though her boyfriend Robbie "Casino" Royal does get injured.

Lori is mentioned at least once in each book. Lori's book, Angel Blue, is the second in Series Two. She had relationships with Benjamin Stanton (Books 1–4), Simon Macey (at the same time as Ben in Book 2 although a real relationship is never established until Lori pretends to like him as a plot to bring down the Solo team), Jake Daly (Books 5–8), various surfer boys (she is dating a boy called Brad on the night she finds Simon Macey dead), and finally, Robbie "Casino" Royal (Angel Blue). Lori has no rivalries, save with villains and Simon Macey after her fleeting relationship with him and unanimously gains leadership after Ben loses it. Lori's family is not necessarily rich, but they are relatively well off. She casts her votes in the two leadership polls for Ben and Jake respectively. She is the third-last to die in Agent Orange, just before Ben and Jake. She is scratched by Modrussa in the cyber-warp which is in the catacombs under the Kraznova, seen in Benjamin White.

==== Jake Daly ====
Codename: Jake Black-- Region Black + Black Ops

Jake is very intense, and strong. He has no known middle name. He has a tangle of black hair and intense dark eyes. His parents' names are George and Liza, and he has a younger sister named Beth. His birthday is 28 February. He is American, born in the Domes (see below). Jake gains one vote in both team leader votes – the first is from Cally in Book 1, the second in Book 5 from Lori. In Edward Red, it mentions one of the regions being Black, but later on in Jake Black, Jake joins the Black Ops, a group of agents who think Deveraux's methods are 'soft' and killing the opponent is more effective. After he exits the Black Ops, he has no cover identity or job. His new region, Black, is not specified in any book. In the Black Ops, his assignment is to kill Sicarius, leader of an apocalyptic terrorist group called the Bringers of the Night. To join this Black Ops, Jake coordinates with Deveraux to stage himself walking away from a falling person. This 'person' however is an animate, but the consequence of not preventing a preventable death is a mindwipe. The rest of the Bond Team believes the ruse at first, however, the mindwipe contraption was faked as well, allowing Jake to join the Black Ops. Jake goes undercover in Aquatraz prison to make contact with a captive Bringer called Null, who turns out to be Sicarius himself. Jake is tempted to let Sicarius die, like his mission dictates, but he cannot. Deveraux understands this and returns Jake to be a regular spy for Spy High.

Despite savage instincts, Jake never allows anybody to die. There are two exceptions: Kim Tang sacrifices herself for him, and Talon, killer of Jennifer Chen, falls off a building refusing Jake's help. Jake is mentioned at least once in each book. His book, Jake Black, is the Fifth and penultimate book in Series Two. Jake had relationships with Jennifer Chen and Lori Angel. He and Cally nearly go out, and he rejects a girl called Dark in Jake Black. Jake never leads the team, but demonstrates potential leadership qualities when he is not working with the leader at the time. Jake's rivalries are with Ben Stanton and Simon Macey as well as the villains. Jake lived in an impoverished background at the Domes until he was selected for Devereaux Academy. He is quite poor. He casts his votes in the two leadership polls for Ben and Lori respectively. He and Ben are the second last to go in Agent Orange...but not before they resolve their differences.

==== Jennifer Chen ====
Codename: none allocated

Jen shows a lot of potential for growth as a character, but unfortunately dies after only two and a half books. Jen has no known middle name. She has long dark hair and green eyes. Her parents' names are not given, but she has a little brother named Shang. They are all killed by Talon for not paying protection from his gang, the Serpents. This happens prior to the story. Her birthday is 17 November. She is a Chinese-American, born in undertown LA. She is the best martial artist in the history of Spy High. She is killed before she can pass examinations and does not gain a single vote in the one leadership poll she is alive for. Because she never graduates, she is never given a region colour. However, her replacement Rebecca Deveraux is later allocated Orange, which would lead us to presume she would have filled the same spot had she not been killed. Jen has a relationship with Jake at the time of her death. Her obvious rivalry is with Talon. In book 4, she is cloned and returns to the team temporarily, but she kills herself once she learns what happened, taking clone Averill Frankenstein with her.

==== Calista Cross ====
Codename: Calista Green--Region Green

Cally is a tough character, but seems to have trouble with emotion. However, her behaviour can be blamed on the apparent death of her boyfriend Ben Stanton in his solo book, Benjamin White. She has no known middle name. She is an African-American, with brown dreadlocks and green eyes. She was adopted at a young age and was given the surname "Cross" due to the cross necklace she was wearing. In Calista Green, her parents are identified as Colby and Simone Lane. Her mother's maiden name is Halliday. She learns about her parents' murder in the book. She is the best computer hacker in the history of Spy High and is the second best Sky-Biker after Eddie.

Region Green covers Japan and China as well as other parts of Asia. Her first field handler is Mei Ataki, but she is replaced in Calista Green by young Jimmy Kwan. Her supposed cover identity is to work in "The Shop", her base of operations centred in Hong Kong. Her assignment is to investigate Thornchild Industries after Professor Werner Wagner is killed.

Cally cannot activate the Guardian Star's tractor beam to save Jen and Frankenstein in Book 4 of Series 1. Cally is mentioned in all the books. Her Series 2 book, Calista Green, is the fourth book in the series. Cally has a crush on Jake in Frankenstein Factory. Her votes for Team Leader go to Jake and Lori, in that order. She is the first to go in Agent Orange, when she steps on a metal plate near the temporal lobe of the villain's "brain", which runs her through with a laser bolt and pixellates her.

==== Edward Nelligan ====
Codename: Edward Red--Region Red

Eddie Nelligan acts largely as the comic relief, though in Edward Red he finally proves his worth as a spy. He has no known middle name. His hair is bright red. He is described as having a round face and being skinny. His parents' names are not given. However, it is said in the sixth book that his father is tall and thin and his mother is short and plump. He has no known siblings. Eddie's birthday is 1 April, April Fool's Day. He is of Irish heritage, presumably born in Ireland. He is the best Sky Biker in Spy High history. He won the Under-18 European Sky Bike division and Oahu Cup 2064 . Before Bex joins the team, he is last in every other area of study. He gains one vote from Ben in the first leadership vote, which is more tactical than anything. His region, Red, is based in London (Camden Town to be precise) and Westminster and covers all of Europa/Europe). His field handler is Bowler. His cover job and identity is a Sky Bike mechanic. His assignment in Edward Red is to stop the Terrorist Group Albion from launching another strike after they destroy the Channel Bridge. Ultimately, he has to stop Bartholomew Knight from becoming ruler of Europa.

Eddie is mentioned in every book. His Series Two Book, Edward Red, is the first in Series Two. Eddie fancies everybody but is especially in love with Bex. There's a hint of a relationship at the end of the Annihilation Agenda, but it's gone by Edward Red. In Edward Red, he dates Bella, Boudica Knight, and Rose Warwick. He has only one rivalry with Frankie Garvey, who is quite similar to Ben in character. Although his teammates appear to dislike him, it is obvious they wouldn't know what they would do without him. His votes went to Ben and Lori respectively. He is second to go in Agent Orange when he jumps in front of Bex.

==== Rebecca "Bex" Deveraux ====
Codename: Agent Orange--Region Orange

Bex Deveraux joins Bond Team as Bex Dee to hide the fact that she is Jonathon Deveraux's daughter. It turns out that her father did not even want her to go to the college because of the dangers that could face her after she graduates. She is a very strong person and second only to Eddie in terms of comedic value. She has no known middle name. She is known for her multicoloured hair and lots of piercings. Her mother is dead and her father, Jonathan Deveraux, was also thought to be dead, though it later turns out he has been virtualised. She has no known siblings. She is born 3 September 2048 in America. In Ben's analysis of her in Book 4, she is weak and the lowest on the Bond Team. She is known for quick thinking and always has a laser-stud handy. Passes Exams – 54% lowest, 87% highest. Aggregate is 70%. She never gains any votes in Team Leader polls.

Region Orange is based in Cairo, Egypt. Her field handler is Anwar Saddiqi. No cover job or identity is supplied. Her assignment becomes taking down her own father, since he is trying to turn the world into zombies. She is mentioned in all books after her introduction in Book 4. Her Series Two Book, Agent Orange, is the last book in Series 2 and Spy High as a whole. Only has a brief affair with Eddie, but the relationship has disappeared by Edward Red, somehow. A fleeting relationship with Simon Macey, as well, but other than that there's nothing. Her only rivalry is with Eddie for a little of Annihilation Agenda, and, occasionally, her father. She votes for Lori, in the second election. She confronts and ultimately defeats her father, who is then transformed into an animate with less power than before.

=== Solo Team of 2064 ===
Only two members are truly known: Simon Macey and Sonia Dark. In Chaos Connection, Simon and Sonia are dating even though it first appears that Simon likes Lori, though this turns out to be a deception. There are three other members of Solo Team that are known only by last name: Huxley, Johns, and Conrad. The final member remains unknown.

==== Simon Macey ====
Codename: Simon Grey

Simon is primarily conniving and manipulative, though he displays some decent qualities in both Angel Blue and The Chaos Connection. He has no known middle name and no description given beyond cold eyes and good-looking. His parents are never mentioned and he has no known siblings. His birthday not mentioned, no is it supplied by the website. He is presumably American and a very good agent in that he can compete with some of bond team. He passes exams, but loses a bet with Cally and Ben and has to run three times naked around the quad.

He is allocated to Region Grey. He has no field handler. His job is to make sense of communications from around the world and help put a stop to any threats to it. His current assignment is to work out who is going to assassinate the president. He lets himself die, but nobody else. He appears in the entirety of Series 1 and again in Angel Blue in Series 2. He dies within 100 pages of Angel Blue. He has a relationship with Sonia Dark, which presumably ends after Chaos Connection when he uses her to protect himself from the Stasis Bolts in last team standing. He also has a very fleeting relationships with Bex and Lori. He's the leader of Solo Team for the entirety of the first series and is marked by his rivalries with Diana Judson, Benjamin Stanton, Jake Daly, and Lori Angel (post Chaos Connection). He never interacts enough with the other three Bond originals truly form a rivalry.

==== Sonia Dark ====
Codename: Sonia Magenta

Little is known about her. She dates Simon Macey in the first two books until he uses her as a shield. She's known to be cruel just as Simon and the rest of the Solo team. Sonia supports Simon wholeheartedly until he uses her to his own advantage. She and the rest of her team come to Simon's defence even when he doesn't deserve it. Despite the fact that she no longer likes Simon, she knows that she'll eventually end up working on the same side as him after graduation. Sonia, however, doesn't show up in any of the second books so we never learn what happens after the first several missions.

=== Other students ===
==== Kate Taylor ====
Taylor is created by Kate Harrison, who won the Spy High hall of fame competition. Major role as a student in Agent Orange. She is taken over by Jonathan Deveraux, alias the Deliverer, and attempts to reveal the hiding location of Bond Team and several other teachers. She is later freed from Deveraux's control. She also has two known teammates Jerry, who is apparently trigger happy, and Olivia who is like the Cally of the team. They are all on Hannay team.

==== Ty Brooke ====
Similar to Ben Stanton. Very arrogant, always bragged about what he'd do after graduation. Eventually was called to Grant's room for mind wiping, but tried to make a run for it. Made it out of the college but then ran into Keene, who "escorted" him to Grant's study where he was eventually mind wiped. Mentioned only in book 6.

==== Will Challis ====
The previous leader of the Bond Team who later is killed in a battle at Dr. Averill's lodge.

== The World of Spy High ==
=== Environment ===
The ozone layer has fully disintegrated in 2020 (Frankenstein Factory) but it is not mentioned what has replaced it in any novel. Due to increased pollution, also in 2020, farming was difficult. This led to the creation of Domes, large enclosed farms where the temperature, precipitation and every aspect of people's lives are controlled. There is no longer room for criminals on land, thus, prisoners are sent to penal satellites or jails on the bottom of the sea (Aquatraz). Motorcycles have been replaced by Sky-Bikes (electric motorcycles without wheels, using hover technology); cars by wheellesses; guns by pulse-rifles, stun-guns, and other electric weapons. There are also the invention of thermal clothes which can be set for ideal temperatures leading people to live in freezing Antarctica (Agent Orange).

=== Deveraux College ===
Deveraux College – the Deveraux Academy in the US books – was built by Mr. Jonathan Deveraux before his death. Situated north of Boston, USA, it is a large Gothic mansion-like building covered with ivy, surrounded by a lake, a golf course, and fields for sports complexes. There is a continuous hologrammatic game of football being played to maintain the cover. The first floor of the college, home to ex-secret agent receptionist Violet Crabtree, is also filled with holograms of students. An elevator decorated to look like a study, descends to the heart of Spy High – a very technologically advanced floor containing the Intelligence Gathering Centre, hologym, virtual reality room and all the techs.

=== Staff ===
==== Jonathan Deveraux ====
Bex's father and the owner/creator of Deveraux Academy. His real death occurred when Bex was only five years old. Little did she know her father's mind was updated onto computers so he could continue to live even after his death. In Agent Orange, Jonathan Deveraux's cyber self disowns him when he begins feeling human feelings. This leads to his cyberdeath. However, Professor Henry Newbolt (Gadge) was able to transfer Deveraux's cyber self into an animate.

- Senior Tutor Elmore Grant hand-picked the Bond Team of 2064. He is responsible for teaching Spycraft and the history of espionage. Twenty years before the books are written, he was on a mission and a bomb was defused, leading to the loss of his legs. In the first book, he almost regrets choosing the people he did for Bond Team.
- Ms. Lacey Bannon is Spy High's weapon's instructor.
- Corporal Randolph Keene is in charge of disciplinary matters, tactical planning, infiltration techniques and physical education.
- Mr. Kazuo Korita teaches martial arts.
- Professor Henry Newbolt or Gadge is responsible for the creation of the holo-gym, virtual reality rooms and other important inventions that are crucial to Spy High. Professor Gadge is now senile.
- Violet Crabtree is a Spy High graduate and current receptionist. She is also the oldest living graduate at Spy High.

=== Villains ===
- Averill Frankenstein--Frankenstein's descendant who discovered genetic changing gas (Book 1 and 4).
- Vlad Tespech--ruler of Wallachia. Manufactures the drug Drac (Book 3 and Benjamin White).
- The Draculesti/Modrussa--The Draculesti are an army of people addicted to the drug Drac which leaves skin flaky and white, teeth pointed, hands with wolf-like nails, and a deadly thirst for blood. Modrussa is the leader. (The Serpent Scenario)(Benjamin White)
- Sicarius--ruler of terrorist group Bringers of the Night (Jake Black).
- Talon--ruler of the Serpent Gang. Murdered Jennifer Chen's family and, in Book 3, killed Jennifer (The Serpent Scenario)
- Nemesis--Computer virus that infects Spy High. Stopped by the Bond Team. (Chaos Connection/Rising)
- Alexander Cain--Ben's uncle that is a partner in a cult which brainwashes young and uses their souls to bring life back to the elders. (Book 5)
- Diluvians--aliens that come to earth to melt the polar caps in an attempt to flood the earth and then invade it (Book 6)
- Oliver Craven--helped the Diluvians until he disobeyed orders and was killed (Book 6)
- The Judson Siblings--Multi-millionaire manufacturers that are involved in a plot to assassinate the President. (Angel Blue)
- Bartholomew Knight--owner of Europa, who wants to unearth the Pendragon Project and use the weapons to make himself ruler of Europa (Edward Red).
- Adam Thornchild--cyborg who tries to turn the entire planet into cyborgs or kill them all(Calista Green)
