= Stand Up for Europe =

Movement for democracy & federalism

- President: Alain Deneef
- Vice President: Bálint Gyévai
- Secretary General: Luca Polidori
- Board Member: Alba Requejo
- Treasurer: Faedran Bourhani
- Founded: 3 December 2016
- Merger of: European Federalist Party, United States of Europe Now, Stand up for the United States of Europe
- Ideology: European federalism European integration Democratisation; Social liberalism
- Political position: non-partisan
- Colours: Blue Yellow

Stand Up for Europe is a pan-European citizens' movement that campaigned for a more democratic and federal Europe.

== History ==
Stand Up for Europe was launched at the 6th European Federalist Convention in Brussels on 3 December 2016, through the integration of three eurofederalist movements: Stand up for the United States of Europe, the European Federalist Party, and United States of Europe Now. It was one of several new pro-European civil movements that sprang up in response to the anti-European outcome of the Brexit referendum and the United States 2016 presidential election results.

On 6 May 2017, Stand Up for Europe was one of the co-sponsors of a day-long debate in Brussels, led by the European Committee of the Regions' chair Markku Markkula, on the future of the European Union, and how to advance European integration.

== Organisation ==
Stand Up for Europe is set up as a nonprofit organisation (Association sans but lucratif, ASBL) under Belgian law. Richard Laub, Georgios Kostakos, Olivier Boruchowitch, and Pietro De Matteis are listed as its founders. The organisation has the following bodies: (i) General Meeting, (ii) Executive Board, (iii) Group of Advisors, (iv) Dispute Committee, (v) Auditor, and (vi) Ombudsman. The General Meeting is convened at least once per calendar year between November and February. It appoints the members of the Executive Board by simple majority vote for a renewable period of one year. Among others, the Board comprises the following positions, which are filled by the following persons:

- President: Alain Deneef
- Vice-President: Bálint Gyévai
- General Secretary: Luca Polidori
- Treasurer: Faedran Bourhani
- Board Member: Alba Requejo

== Goals ==
Stand Up for Europe aims for greater European integration, more direct democracy, and more solidarity.

- A European Constitution
- A European intelligence agency
- A pan-European arts project
- A European youth day

Furthermore, Stand Up for Europe seeks to merge or cooperate with other similar organisations, such as Volt Europa, Pulse of Europe, Young European Federalists and the New Europeans.

== See also ==
- Pulse of Europe Initiative
- Young European Federalists
- United States of Europe
