= A. J. Butcher =

English author

Andrew James Butcher, better known as A. J. Butcher, is an English writer best known for the futuristic teen spy series, Spy High. Butcher taught English at both Poole Grammar School and Parkstone Grammar School, in Poole, Dorset, and currently teaches at Talbot Heath School in Bournemouth, Dorset. He took a sabbatical from his teaching career to write Spy High Series Two. He says he has been influenced by Charles Dickens and George Orwell, but that Stan Lee, creator of many of Marvel Comics' super-heroes, is his biggest inspirational figure.

The series is published by Atom Books in the UK and Commonwealth and Little, Brown and Co. in the US. The first series has also been translated into many other languages.

== Spy High: Series 1 ==
The first series he had written consists of six books, similar to the second series. Each book is about the Bond Team's struggle through their education. They must defeat criminals and viruses, and possibly most importantly of all, they must accept the death of a teammate and trust the replacement.

== Reaper Trilogy ==
1. The Time of the Reaper
2. Slave Harvest
3. The Tomorrow Seed
