= Arthur Potter =

British army officer and diplomat (1905–1998)

Arthur Potter, CMG, CBE
- Born: 7 April 1905; Dublin, United Kingdom of Great Britain and Ireland (now Republic of Ireland)
- Died: 25 February 1998 (aged 92) Easebourne, Midhurst, West Sussex, England
- Allegiance: United Kingdom
- Branch: (British Raj) British Indian Army
- Service years: 1943-1947
- Rank: Brigadier
- Conflicts: Second World War
- Awards: Companion of the Order of St Michael and St George, Commander of the Order of the British Empire, Mentioned in Dispatches

Brigadier Arthur Kingscote Potter CMG CBE (7 April 1905 – 25 February 1998) was a British Indian Army officer, civil servant and diplomat.

== Early life ==
Potter was born in Dublin, United Kingdom of Great Britain and Ireland, the son of Richard Ellis Potter and Harriot Isabel Kingscote (b. 22 Dec 1865, d. 3 Apr 1940). He was educated at Charterhouse School and New College, Oxford.

== Career ==
He entered the Indian Civil Service on 9 October 1928. In December of that year he was posted to Burma as Assistant Commissioner, and oversaw the Government relief effort following the 1930 Pyu earthquake. In 1934 Potter became a District Commissioner in Burma and in 1937 he was appointed Controller of Finance.

In 1942, Potter became financial advisor to the British Burma Army, before serving briefly as Financial Secretary to the Government of Burma. On 1 June 1943 he received a commission in the British Indian Army and subsequently worked as financial adviser to the 11th Army Group. From 1944 to 1947 he was Chief Financial Officer to the Military Administration of Burma, and he was made a Commander of the Order of the British Empire in June 1946.

In November 1947, he was transferred to HM Treasury, and was the Treasury's representative in India, Burma and Pakistan until 1950. Between 1950 and 1956 Potter was Assistant Secretary at HM Treasury. His final posting was as a Counsellor in the UK Delegation to NATO in Paris from 1956 to his retirement in 1965. Potter was made a Companion of the Order of St Michael and St George in the 1957 New Year Honours.

== Personal life ==
On 20 July 1950, he married Hilda Hodgkinson Butterfield, the daughter of William Arthur Butterfield OBE and Rebecca Emelda Stevenson; they had one daughter, Beatrice.
