= Christopher Hill (political scientist) =

British political scientist

Christopher Hill FBA
- Born: Christopher John Hill; 20 November 1948 (age 77)

Academic background
- Education: University of Oxford (MA, DPhil)
- Thesis: The decision-making process in relation to British foreign policy, 1938-1941 (1979)

Christopher John Hill FBA (born 20 November 1948) is an emeritus professor of international relations at the University of Cambridge.

== Education ==
Hill was educated at the University of Oxford where he received both his Master of Arts and Doctor of Philosophy degrees.

== Career and research ==
From 1974 to 2004 he taught in the Department of International Relations at the London School of Economics and Political Science where he was the Montague Burton Professor of International Relations from 1991. He was head of the Department of Politics and International Studies (POLIS) at Cambridge, 2012–14.

He has published widely in the areas of foreign policy analysis, European politics and general international relations. He is a past chair of the British International Studies Association, and was elected a Fellow of the British Academy in 2007. He was a member of the RAE2008 Panel for Politics and International Studies. From 2016 to 2019 he has been Wilson E. Schmidt Distinguished Professor of International Relations at the School of Advanced International Studies, Johns Hopkins University, Bologna.

=== Selected publications ===
- "The Capability-Expectations Gap, or Conceptualizing Europe's International Role", in Journal of Common Market Studies, vol. 31, no. 3, September 1993, pp. 305–28. Available in pdf format here.
- Two Worlds of International Relations: Academics, Practitioners and the Trade in Ideas (ed. with Pamela Beshoff), Routledge, an imprint of Taylor & Francis Books Ltd, 1994. ISBN 0-415-11323-7
- Domestic Sources of Foreign Policy: West European Reactions to the Falklands Conflict (with Stelios Stavridis), Berg Publishers Ltd, 1996. ISBN 1-85973-089-2
- European Foreign Policy: Key Documents (ed. with Karen E. Smith), Routledge, an imprint of Taylor & Francis Books Ltd, 2000. ISBN 0-415-15823-0
- Cabinet Decisions on Foreign Policy: The British Experience, October 1938-June 1941, Cambridge University Press, 2002. ISBN 0-521-89402-6
- The Changing Politics of Foreign Policy, Palgrave Macmillan, 2003. ISBN 0-333-75423-9
- The National Interest in Question: Foreign Policy in Multicultural Societies. OUP Oxford. 22 August 2013. ISBN 978-0-19-166361-1.
- Foreign Policy in the Twenty-First Century. Bloomsbury Publishing. 2 November 2015. ISBN 978-1-350-31146-6.
- The Future of British Foreign Policy: Security and Diplomacy in a World after Brexit. John Wiley & Sons. 12 March 2019. ISBN 978-1-5095-2465-5.
