= Centre for Studies on Federalism =

Turin university established 2000

Coordinates: 45°00′01″N 7°41′06″E

- Type: Research university
- Established: 2000
- President: Alfonso Iozzo
- Director: Flavio Brugnoli
- Location: Turin, Italy
- Website: www.csfederalismo.it/en

The Centre for Studies on Federalism (CSF) was established in November 2000 with the primary purpose of studying and researching the theory and practice of Federalism both as a political doctrine and in its implementation in the institutional systems of the Modern state. CSF's main focus is on the infra-national, macro-regional and global scale of federalism: it specifically considers regional integration at a time of globalisation, with special reference to Europe, its history and civilization, its progress towards unification and its future.

== Structure and mission ==
CSF is housed at the Collegio Carlo Alberto in Turin. It was established as a research centre jointly with the University of Pavia and University of Turin, with the Foundation Compagnia di San Paolo, and was subsequently joined by the University of Milan. The purpose of CSF – as stated in its Statute of Association is to promote and coordinate scientific research on studies on federalism, as well promoting and coordinating activities with member universities and other Italian and foreign international universities and research centres. Furthermore, CSF also cooperates with private and public agencies and bodies interested in promoting fostering the development of knowledge and implementation of federalist principles. The CSF is governed by a Board which sets the guidelines for the scientific projects and fund allocation, the Steering Committee, the Board of Auditors and by a Scientific Committee whose members are renowned international scholars and experts of federalism. The administrative and scientific staff also include researchers from several universities and fields of research, including Law, Economics, Social, Political Science and History. Lastly, CSF's Library contains some 12,000 books volumes, subscribes to 70 newspapers, journals and magazines. It also houses 500 ones titles that are no longer in print as well as a number of special collections bequeathed to the centre, such as the CIME Archive of the Italian Council of the European Movement and the online document summary of the Altiero Spinelli Collection, of which the hard copies are at Historical Archives of the European Union administered by the European University Institute in Florence.

== Research ==
Research at the CSF is aimed at furthering the development of knowledge on the various aspects of Federalism, promoting debate in the public arena by studying and researching the public arena through studies and research on the above and to encourage researchers and experts to contribute to the discussion on European and international issues. Our Research Papers are addressed to Academia but also cover the facets and issues of interest for diplomats, politicians and several other professional arenas. Furthermore, CSF activity includes a number of editorial projects, in-depth studies, monitoring and surveying of global trends related to processes of federation, regional integration and international democracy. These include:

- Perspectives on Federalism: an online journal with a forum on federalism in all tiers of government – regional and global sub-national authorities.
- Bibliographical Bulletin on Federalism: an online quarterly offering providing an overview of articles on Federalism from 700 Italian, English, French, German and Spanish journals and papers.
- International Democracy Watch: a portal whose purpose is to collect, compare and analyse a set of data to monitor progress and developments of democracy, international institutions and agencies, assessing such changes through regular monitoring;
- Operations within the framework of the Common Security and Defence Policy (EU CSDP Operations): these projects are aimed at gathering information for a comparative analysis of military, policing and state operations within the EU Common Foreign and Security Policy (CFSP) since 2003.
- The Fiscal Federalism Watch to gain a better understanding of the reorganization of the Italian public finance system in Italy and what the consequences of a constitutional reform needed for fiscal federalism would be

== Events and activities ==
CSF organises meetings and seminars jointly with other institutions and research bodies devoted to a more comprehensive understanding of certain topics or to the presentation of books some of which published by CSF. The Altiero Spinelli Lecture is the CSF's most important academic event: a yearly conference with a keynote lecture (lectio magistralis) held by an internationally renowned expert or academic on a European or Federalist topic. The idea of naming the lecture after Altiero Spinelli, one of the founding fathers of European Federalism, came from the need for an ad hoc conference to study European integration more in depth. CSF also offers and Education programme, with post graduate courses in Law and Business, organised with the Turin University Institute of European Studies, aimed at offering advanced studies on law and economics with a special focus on to the internal EU market.

== See also ==
- Alexander Hamilton
- Altiero Spinelli
- Carl Joachim Friedrich
- Carlo Cattaneo
- Daniel J. Elazar
- Ernesto Rossi
- European Federalist Movement
- European Integration
- European Union
- Federalism
- Federalist Papers
- Federation
- Fiscal federalism
- History of European Union
- John Robert Seeley
- Kenneth Wheare
- International organization
- Lionel Robbins
- Luigi Einaudi
- Philip Henry Kerr
- Pierre-Joseph Proudhon
- Regional integration
- Regionalism (politics)
- Young European Federalists
- Ventotene Manifesto
