= Altiero Spinelli =

Italian politician (1907–1986)

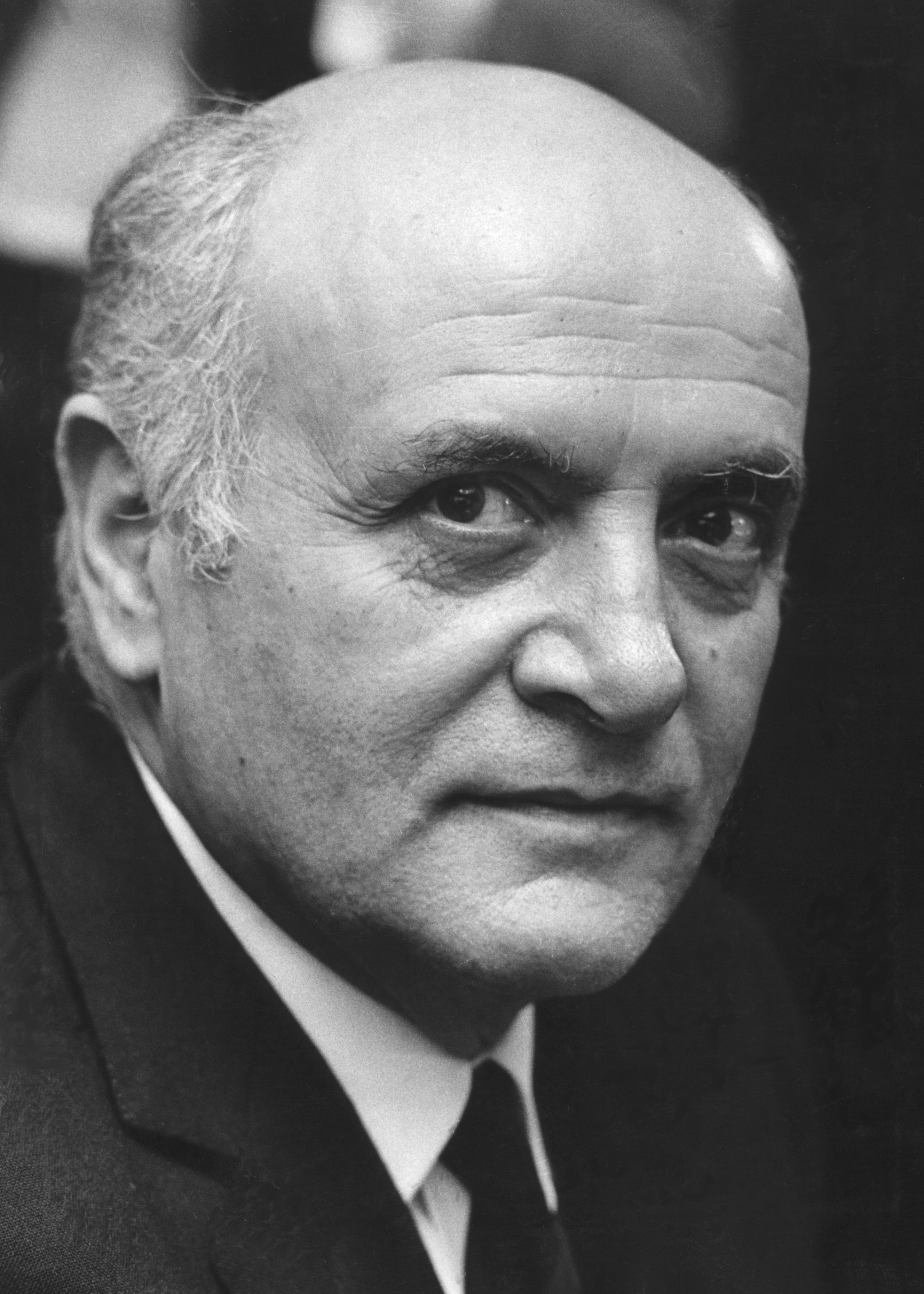
- Spinelli in 1970

Commissioner for Industry and Entrepreneurship
- In office 1 July 1970 – 4 July 1976
- President: Franco Maria Malfatti; Sicco Mansholt
- Preceded by: Guido Colonna di Paliano
- Succeeded by: Étienne Davignon

Member of the European Parliament for Central Italy
- In office 17 July 1979 – 23 May 1986

Member of the Chamber of Deputies
- In office 5 July 1976 – 11 July 1983
- Constituency: Rome

Personal details
- Born: 31 August 1907 Rome, Kingdom of Italy
- Died: 23 May 1986 (aged 78) Rome, Italy
- Party: Independent Left (1976–1983)
- Other political affiliations: PCdI (1924–1937); PdA (1943–1946); CDR (1946)
- Spouse: Ursula Hirschmann (m. 1945)
- Children: 3, including Barbara
- Profession: Writer

Altiero Spinelli (31 August 1907 – 23 May 1986) was an Italian politician, political theorist and European federalist, referred to as one of the founding fathers of the European Union. A communist and militant anti-fascist in his youth, Spinelli spent 10 years imprisoned by the Italian fascist regime. Having grown disillusioned with Stalinism, he broke with the Communist Party of Italy in 1937. Interned in Ventotene during World War II, he, along with fellow democratic socialists, drafted the manifesto For a Free and United Europe (most commonly known as the Ventotene Manifesto) in 1941, considered a precursor of the European integration process.

Spinelli had a leading role in the foundation of the European Federalist Movement, and had a strong influence on the first few decades of post-World War II European integration. Later, he helped to re-launch the integration process in the 1980s. By the time of his death, he had been a member of the European Commission for six years, and a member of the European Parliament for ten years right up until his death. The main building of the European Parliament in Brussels is named after him. The 1987–1988 academic year at the College of Europe and the 2009–2010 academic year of the European College of Parma were named in his honour.

== Early life ==
Spinelli was born in Rome, the son of a socialist father. He joined the Communist Party of Italy (PCd'I) at age 17 in 1924. Following his entry into radical journalism, he was arrested in 1927 and spent ten years in prison and a further six in confinement. In June 1939 he was interned on the island of Ventotene (in Lazio) along with some eight hundred other political opponents of the regime. Here he became involved in the PCI underground. In 1937, he was expelled from the PCd'I for opposing Stalinism.

== Ventotene Manifesto ==
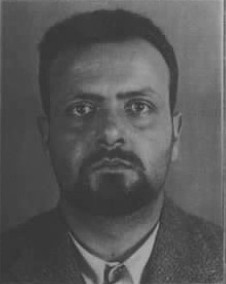
Spinelli when a prisoner in Ventotene, 1930s

In June 1941, well before the outcome of the war was safely predictable, Spinelli and fellow prisoner Ernesto Rossi completed the Ventotene Manifesto, eventually entitled Per un'Europa libera e unita ("For a Free and United Europe. A Draft Manifesto"), which argued that, if the fight against the fascist powers were successful, it would be in vain if it merely led to the re-establishment of the old European system of sovereign nation-states in shifting alliances. This would inevitably lead to war again. The document called for the establishment of a European federation by the democratic powers after the war. Because of a need for secrecy and a lack of proper materials at the time, the Manifesto was written on cigarette papers, concealed in the false bottom of a tin box and smuggled to the mainland by Ursula Hirschmann. It was then circulated through the Italian Resistance, and was later adopted as the programme of the European Federalist Movement (MFE), which Spinelli, Colorni and some 20 others established, as soon as they were able to leave their internment camp. The founding meeting was held in clandestinity in Milan on the 27/28 of August 1943.

The Manifesto was widely circulated in other resistance movements towards the end of the war. Resistance leaders from several countries met clandestinely in Geneva in 1944, a meeting attended by Spinelli. The Manifesto put forward proposals for creating a European federation of states, the primary aim of which was to tie European countries so closely together that they would no longer be able to go to war with one another. As in many European left-wing political circles, this sort of move towards federalist ideas was argued as a reaction to the destructive excesses of nationalism. The ideological underpinnings for a united Europe can thus be traced to hostility to nationalism. In the founding meeting of the MFE, he said: "If a post-war order is established in which each State retains its complete national sovereignty, the basis for a Third World War would still exist even after the Nazi attempt to establish the domination of the German race in Europe has been frustrated."

The Manifesto criticised the "capitalist imperialism which our own generation has seen expand to the point of forming totalitarian states and to the unleashing of world wars". It also declared that "the European revolution must be socialist, that is it must have as its goal the emancipation of the working classes and the realization for them of more humane living conditions". However it opposed "doctrinaire" formulations of transitions to socialism and said "private property must be abolished, limited, corrected, extended: instance by instance, however, not dogmatically according to principle".

== Federalist advocate ==
After the war, Spinelli, leading the federalist MFE, played a vanguard role in the early episodes of European integration, criticising the small-steps approach and the dominance of intergovernmentalism, feeling even that the chance to unite Europe had been missed as sovereign states were re-established without any common bond other than the functionalist OEEC and the largely symbolic Council of Europe. Even the European Coal and Steel Community (ECSC) was felt to be too sectoral. The MFE believed governments alone would never relinquish their national power without popular pressure. They advocated a European constituent assembly to draft a European Constitution.

A critic of the USSR, Spinelli argued that "only when it is faced by a united federal Europe will the USSR be brought to a halt".

This approach eventually had a response from governments when they set up the "ad hoc assembly" of 1952–3. It was Spinelli who persuaded Italian Prime Minister Alcide De Gasperi to insist in the negotiation of the European Defence Community (EDC) treaty on a provision for a parliamentary assembly to draw up plans for placing the EDC, the ECSC and any other development within a global constitutional framework to "replace the present provisional organization" with "a subsequent federal or confederal structure based on the principle of the separation of powers and having, in particular, a two-chamber system of representation". The Assembly was invited to submit its proposals within six months of its constitutive meeting following the entry into force of the EDC treaty. In fact, the Foreign Ministers, meeting three months after the signature of the EDC treaty, invited the ECSC Assembly immediately to draft a "treaty constituting a European Political Authority" without waiting for ratification of the EDC Treaty.

Spinelli played a significant role in advising the drafting of the Assembly's proposal for a European "Statute". However, the failure of France to ratify the EDC treaty meant it was all to no immediate avail. Some of its ideas, however, were taken up in subsequent events.

== European politician ==
Following the crisis of the failure of the EDC and the "re-launch" under the Paul-Henri Spaak committee, which led to the 1958 EEC Treaty, Spinelli, recognising that the EEC institutions were the only real existing form of European integration, but still considering that they were insufficient and that they lacked democratic legitimacy, embarked on a "long march through the institutions". In 1970, he was nominated by the Italian government to be a member of the European Commission from 1970 to 1976, taking responsibility for industrial policy to develop European policies in a new field.

Spinelli decided to run in the first direct elections to the European Parliament in 1979. He did so as an independent candidate on the list of the Italian Communist Party (PCI), which by then had become a Eurocommunist party and was keen to have prominent independent figures to stand on its list of candidates. Spinelli agreed to stand on the PCI list upon the premise that the PCI was "committed to democracy; that the idea of an ‘historical compromise’ was seriously meant and would be respected; that European unification was to be supported and the country’s present position in the East-West equilibrium maintained".

While an MEP he was a member of the Communist and Allies Group. Spinelli advocated what he described as a "democratic and social transformation of the European Community". He praised the French communists for providing a "positive contribution to this battle" and said that under his influence the PCI had "adopted the line which I had sought and supported for many years, especially the need to transcend economic unification and move towards a European political union".

To this end, he began to gather like-minded Members of the European Parliament around him, taking care to involve Members from different political groups. An initial meeting at the "Crocodile" restaurant in Strasbourg set up the "Crocodile Club", which, once it was of sufficient size, tabled a motion for Parliament to set up a special committee (eventually established in January 1982 as the Committee on Institutional Affairs, with Spinelli as General Rapporteur) to draft a proposal for a new treaty on the union.

The idea was that the European Parliament should act as a constituent assembly, although Spinelli was prepared to make compromises on the way to secure broad majorities behind the process. On 14 February 1984, the European Parliament adopted his report and approved the Draft Treaty Establishing the European Union. The decision was taken with 237 votes for and 31 against (43 abstentions).

Spinelli's project was soon buried by the governments of the member states. However, it provided an impetus for the negotiations which led to the Single European Act of 1986 and the Maastricht Treaty of 1992. This happened with the help of several national parliaments, which adopted resolutions approving the draft Treaty, and of French President François Mitterrand who, following a meeting with Spinelli, came to the European Parliament to speak in favour of its approach, thereby reversing France's policy (since Charles De Gaulle) of hostility to anything but an intergovernmental approach to Europe. This momentum was enough to obtain the support of a majority of national governments to trigger the treaty revision procedure.

== Personal life ==
He married Ursula Hirschmann, a German anti-fascist activist and fellow advocate of European federalism, in 1945 and they had three daughters: Diana, Barbara, and Sara. Ursula already had another three daughters (Silvia, Renata, and Eva) from her first husband Eugenio Colorni, who was killed by the Nazis in Rome in 1944. Eva Colorni was married to Indian economist Amartya Sen in the last seven years of her life.

== Reception ==
Although the resultant treaties fell short of what Spinelli would have liked, his efforts triggered a new momentum in European integration, including a major increase in the powers of the European Parliament within the EU system. In honour of his work, the largest building of the Espace Léopold, the European Parliament complex in Brussels, was named after him.

On 15 September 2010, under the name Spinelli Group, an initiative was founded to reinvigorate the strive for federalisation of the European Union (EU). Prominent supporters of the group are: Jacques Delors, Joschka Fischer, Daniel Cohn-Bendit, Andrew Duff, Elmar Brok.

== Electoral history ==
Election	House	Constituency	Party	Votes	Result
1976	Chamber of Deputies	Rome–Viterbo–Latina–Frosinone	PCI	35,867	Elected
1979	Chamber of Deputies	Rome–Viterbo–Latina–Frosinone	PCI	21,007	Elected
1979	European Parliament	Central Italy	PCI	129,014	Elected
1984	European Parliament	Central Italy	PCI	172,271	Elected

== Honours ==
- Honorary degree, University of Hull, 1984
- Honorary degree in memoriam, University of Pavia, 1988.
- Honorary degree, Loughborough University, 1973

== See also ==
- Centre for Studies on Federalism
- European Federalist Movement
- Istituto Affari Internazionali
