= Barbara Spinelli =

Italian politician (1946–2026)

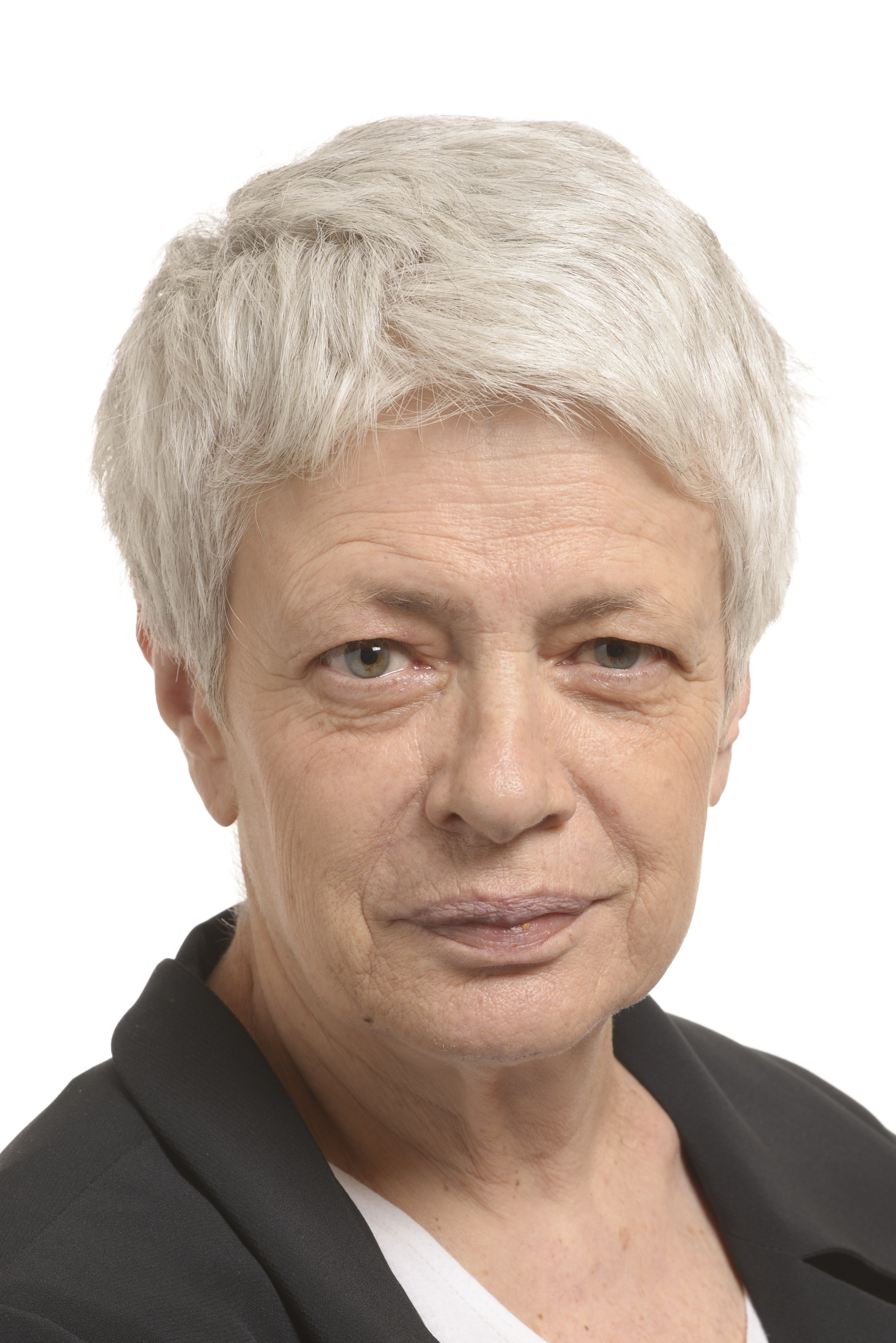

Member of the European Parliament
- In office 1 July 2014 – 2 July 2019
- Constituency: Central Italy

Personal details
- Born: 31 May 1946 Rome, Italy
- Died: 7 October 2026 (aged 80) Rome, Italy
- Party: Independent
- Other political affiliations: The Other Europe (2014-2015)
- Domestic partner(s): Tommaso Padoa-Schioppa (until his death; 2010)
- Parent(s): Ursula Hirschmann (mother); Altiero Spinelli (father)
- Education: Sapienza University of Rome
- Occupation: Journalist

Barbara Spinelli (31 May 1946 – 7 October 2026) was an Italian politician. From 2014 to 2019, Spinelli served as a Member of the European Parliament, representing Central Italy.

== Life and career ==
Barbara Spinelli was born on 31 May 1946, the daughter of federalist political theorist Altiero Spinelli and Ursula Hirschmann, who was a German Jewish anti-fascist activist. She had three older maternal half-sisters from her mother's first marriage to Eugenio Colorni and two sisters. Her half-sister Eva Colorni, an economist, was married to a fellow Indian economist Amartya Sen from 1973 until her death in 1985. Another half-sister is a translator.

She was elected to represent The Other Europe, but left the alliance in May 2015, after declaring it a "failed project". She was one of the founders of the newspaper La Repubblica.

Spinelli was a member of the Advisory Panel of DiEM25. She was also Vice-chair of the Committee on Constitutional Affairs.

Spinelli died on 7 October 2026, at the age of 80.
