= Colorni =

Colorni is an Italian surname. Notable people with the surname include:

- Abramo Colorni (c. 1544–1599), Italian-Jewish polymath
- Eugenio Colorni (1909–1944), Italian philosopher and anti-fascist activist
- Eva Colorni (1941–1985), Italian economist
