= Founding fathers of the European Union =

Key figures of the early European organisations

The founding fathers of the European Union are men who are considered to be major contributors to European unity and the development of what is now the European Union (EU). The number and list of the founding fathers of the EU varies depending on the source. A 2013 EU publication identified 11 men.

Some sources list only a subset of the 11 men as founding fathers. The Council of Europe lists six founding fathers as builders of Europe, including the Briton Ernest Bevin. The media outlet Deutsche Welle presented a different constellation, it listed Richard Coudenhove-Kalergi, Winston Churchill, Robert Schuman, Jean Monnet and Paul-Henri Spaak as the five founding fathers of the EU. Other sources have emphasized Konrad Adenauer of West Germany, Alcide De Gasperi of Italy and Robert Schuman of France as the founding fathers from the three pioneers countries of the European unification.

== List ==
The European Union listed 11 people as its founding fathers in a publication from 2013. These are:

Picture	Name	Country	Description
	Konrad Adenauer	FR Germany	First chancellor of FR Germany, Adenauer attempted to restore relations with France during his term in office between 1949 and 1963. He was instrumental in bringing about the 1963 Élysée Treaty between the two countries. He signed a treaty of friendship with France.
	Joseph Bech	Luxembourg	As Prime Minister of Luxembourg, Bech was actively involved in the establishment of the Benelux Customs Union and later the European Coal and Steel Community. Played an important role in preparing the 1955 Messina Conference which paved the way for the establishment of the European Economic Community in 1958.
	Johan Beyen	Netherlands	Dutch foreign minister and one of the principal architects of the common market after 1955.
	Winston Churchill	United Kingdom	British prime minister during World War II, Churchill called for a "United States of Europe", organised democratically, to prevent future wars in Europe. He was a driving force behind the creation of the Council of Europe.
	Alcide De Gasperi	Italy	First prime minister of the Italian Republic and a skilled mediator creating rapprochement between European states, involved in the creation of the European Coal and Steel Community and of the Council of Europe.
	Walter Hallstein	FR Germany	German academic and diplomat who served as the European Commission's first president at the European Economic Community and played a notable role in creating the common market
	Sicco Mansholt	Netherlands	A farmer and member of the Dutch Resistance during World War II where he witnessed the Dutch famine of 1944, Mansholt's ideas on the need for European self-sufficiency in food formed the basis of the Common Agricultural Policy.
	Jean Monnet	France	A political and economic advisor, Monnet helped to create the Schuman Declaration of 1950, a milestone Franco-German rapprochement after World War II and the creation of the European Coal and Steel Community, and promoted international industrial cooperation.
	Robert Schuman	France	As French foreign minister between 1948 and 1952, Schuman was responsible for the 1950 Schuman Declaration (together with Jean Monnet) which agreed to place France and FR Germany's production of coal and steel under a single international authority, a key milestone towards the European Coal and Steel Community. Upon retiring the European Parliament bestowed him the title of Father of Europe
	Paul-Henri Spaak	Belgium	A Belgian prime minister involved in the negotiation of the Benelux Customs Union in 1944 and later appointed to leading roles in the United Nations, NATO, Council of Europe and European Coal and Steel Community in the 1950s and 1960s. He played an important role in creating the 1957 Treaty of Rome which led to the foundation of the European Economic Community.
	Altiero Spinelli	Italy	A left-wing and progressive politician and convinced federalist, Spinelli was involved in the Italian resistance during World War II and instrumental in the 1941 Ventotene Manifesto. He remained an influential federalist and was the author of the 1984 "Draft Treaty establishing the European Union" (also called the "Spinelli Plan"), beginning a process which would culminate in the Maastricht Treaty and the creation of the European Union.

Other sources discuss fewer names.

== Relabelling as 'EU pioneers' and the inclusion of women ==
Commentators have pointed out that the founding fathers were all men.

Ada Rossi and Ursula Hirschmann, among other women, played a central role in the dissemination of the ideas of a federal Europe of Ventotene Manifesto; their role remains largely unacknowledged.

A clause of equality between men and women was introduced in the Treaty of Rome for economic reasons because of concerns of dumping by countries that used low-paid women's labour.

In a new publication from 2021, the European Union listed 21 people labelled EU pioneers, in which 8 women names have been added to the list of the 11 founding fathers. Those who were added to the list of EU pioneers, including the 8 women, are:

Picture	Name	Country	Description
	Anna Lindh	Sweden	Minister of the Environment and of Foreign Affairs, member of the Swedish parliament and cabinet member when Sweden headed the Council of the European Union who was killed in office.
	François Mitterrand	France	Social democratic and longest-serving President of France during the end of the Cold War and the creation of the European Union.
	Helmut Kohl	Germany	Christian democratic politician and longest-serving head of government of Germany besides Bismarck who served as Chancellor of FR Germany and of reunified Germany during the fall of the Berlin Wall, the end of the Cold War and the creation of the European Union.
	Louise Weiss	France	Suffragette and Gaullist politician who served as MEP in the first elected European Parliament. The main Parliament building in Strasbourg bears her name.
	Marga Klompé	Netherlands	Chemist and Christian democratic politician who was the first female government minister in the Netherlands and also a member of the European Coal and Steel Community Parliament.
	Melina Mercouri	Greece	Award-winning actress and social democratic politician who served as the Greek Minister of Culture and Sports, helped establish the European Capitals of Culture and won a special prize in the first edition of the Europe Theatre Prize.
	Nicole Fontaine	France	MEP for over 20 years and President of the European Parliament from 1999 to 2001.
	Nilde Iotti	Italy	Communist politician, first woman and longest-serving president of the Italian Chamber of Deputies.
	Simone Veil	France	French magistrate, Holocaust survivor, and politician who served as the first President of the elected European Parliament from 1979 to 1982.
	Ursula Hirschmann	Germany	Anti-fascist activist and an advocate of European federalism.

== Proposals and Rome ==
Count Richard von Coudenhove-Kalergi (1894–1972) published the Paneuropa manifesto in 1923 which set up the movement of that name. At the start of the 1950s Robert Schuman (1886–1963), based on a plan by Jean Monnet (1888–1979), called for a European Coal and Steel Community in his "Schuman declaration". Monnet went on to become the first President of the High Authority. Schuman later served as President of the European Parliament and became notable for advancing European integration.

Following its creation, the Treaty of Rome established the European Economic Community. Although not all the people who signed the treaty are known as founding fathers, a number are, such as Paul-Henri Spaak (1899–1972), who also worked on the treaty as well as the Benelux union and was the first President of the European Parliament. Other founding fathers who signed the treaty were Konrad Adenauer (1876–1967) of FR Germany and Joseph Bech (1887–1975) of Luxembourg.

== Others ==
Further men who have been considered founding fathers are: Giuseppe Mazzini (1805–1872) who founded the association "Young Europe" in 1834 with the vision of a united continent; Victor Hugo (1802–1885) who made a speech where he called for United States of Europe in 1849 at the International Peace Congress of Paris; Milan Hodža (1878–1944) who was famous for his attempts to establish a democratic federation of Central European states (book: Federation in central Europe, reflections and reminiscences); Jacques Delors (1925–2023), who was a successful Commission President in the 1980s and 90s; Lorenzo Natali (1922–1989); Carlo Azeglio Ciampi (1920–2016); Mário Soares (1924–2017), Portuguese Prime Minister at the time Portugal acceded the EC and also a 'founding father of democratic Portugal'; and Pierre Werner (1913–2002) a Prime Minister of Luxembourg.

Some have considered American Secretary of State George C. Marshall as an influential force in developing the European Union. His namesake plan to rebuild Europe in the wake of World War II contributed more than $100 billion in today's dollars to the Europeans, helping to feed Europeans, deliver steel to rebuild industries, provide coal to warm homes, and construct dams to help provide power. In doing so, the Marshall Plan encouraged the integration of European powers into the European Coal and Steel Community, the precursor to present-day European Union, by illustrating the effects of economic integration and the need for coordination. The potency of the Marshall Plan caused former Chancellor of FR Germany Helmut Schmidt to remark in 1997 that "America should not forget that the development of the European Union is one of its greatest achievements. Without the Marshall Plan it perhaps would never have come to that."

== See also ==
- History of the European Union
- President of the European Commission
- President of the European Parliament
- List of presidents of the institutions of the European Union
- Richard von Coudenhove-Kalergi
