= Daniela Padoan =

Italian writer

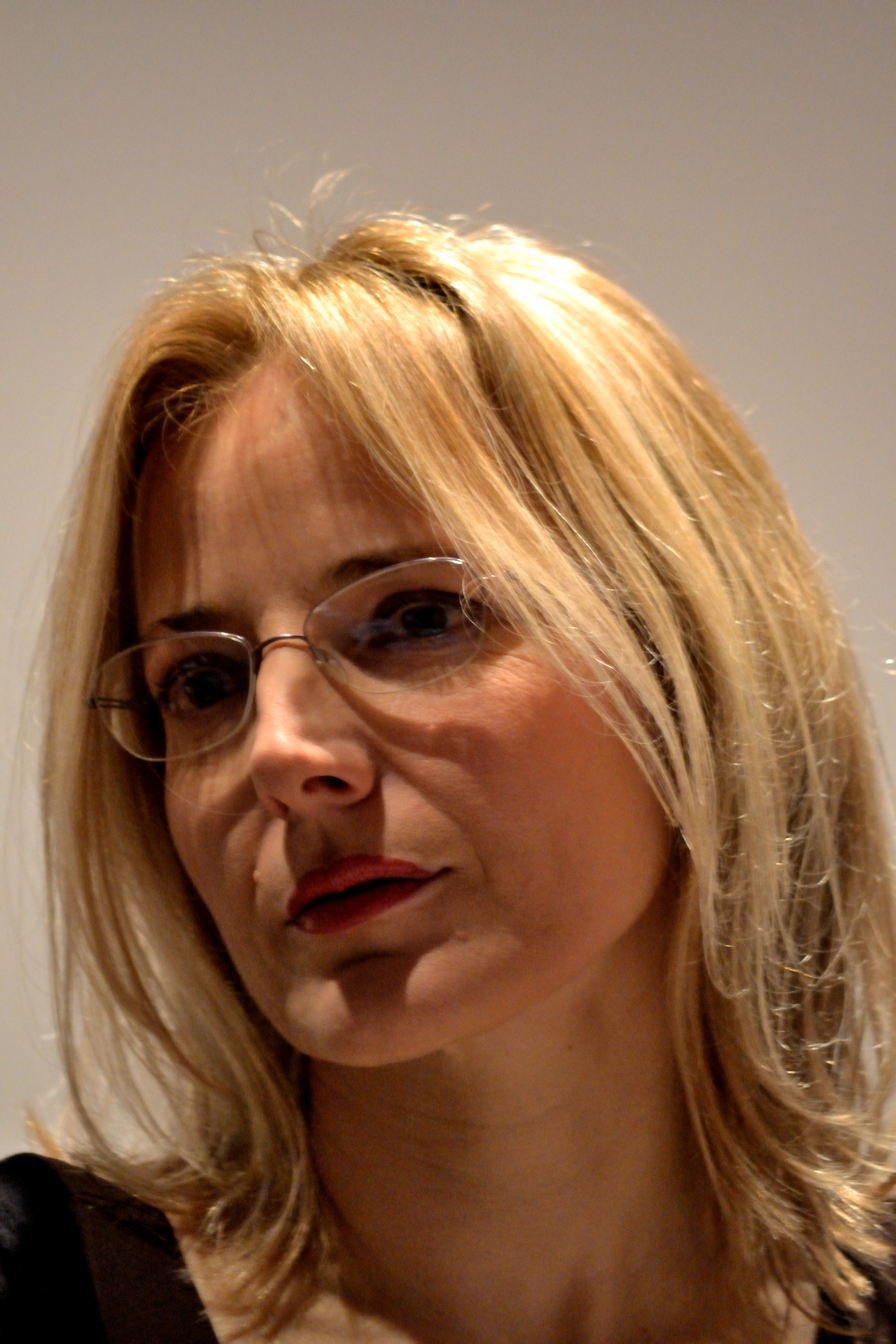
Daniela Padoan in 2012

Daniela Padoan (born 25 November 1958 Bologna) is an Italian writer, essayist, and documentary filmmaker. She won the 2005 Martoglio Prize for Journalism, and the 2006 Nonino Prize

== Life ==
In 2007, Padoan made the documentary La Shoah delle donne for Rai 3. In 2008 she made the documentary From the racial laws to the Shoah (for the broadcast La grande storia ). She dedicated the volume Il paradosso del testimone, an issue of the Rivista dietica, which collected essays by Aharon Appelfeld, Ruth Klüger, Hanna Kugler Weiss, among the most important witnesses of the Shoah.

In 2004 she published, Le pazze. A meeting with the Mothers of the Plaza de Mayo .

In 2006, for Rai News 24, she made a documentary, Via Lecco, 9, about refugees from the Horn of Africa.

She has written book reviews, articles and interviews for the daily Il Manifesto, and for the magazine Via Dogana.

== Activism ==
In 2014 she was a candidate in the European elections in the list The Other Europe with Tsipras, a coalition of parties and associations that supported the candidacy of the leader of SYRIZA Alexis Tsipras at the Presidency of the European Commission.

Since July of the same year she has been the spokesperson in Italy for the MEP Barbara Spinelli, with whom she has worked in particular on the issues of rights, civil liberties and migration. In April 2019 she is nominated in the European elections with the "La Sinistra" list.

She is the president of the association Laudato si' - An alliance for the climate, the Earth and social justice and is one of the founding members of the ADIF association - Rights and borders.

== Works ==
- Miti e leggende del mondo antico, Sansoni, 1996
- Miti e leggende dei popoli del mondo, Sansoni, 1998
- Un'eredità senza testamento. Inchiesta di Fempress sui femminismi di fine secolo, Introduzione, Quaderni di Via Dogana, 2001
- Come una rana d'inverno, conversazioni con tre sopravvissute ad Auschwitz: Liliana Segre, Goti Bauer, Giuliana Tedeschi, Bompiani, 2004, ISBN 978-88-452-9609-3
- Le pazze. Un incontro con le Madri di Plaza de Mayo, Bompiani, 2005
- with Ermanno Olmi, Il sentimento della realtà, Editrice San Raffaele, 2008
- La costruzione della testimonianza tra storia e letteratura, in A. Chiappano, Essere donne nei Lager, Giuntina, 2009
- Tra scrittura e libertà. I discorsi dei Premi Nobel per la Letteratura, Editrice San Raffaele, 2010
- (a cura di) Il paradosso del testimone, n. 45 (3/2010) anno L, Rosenberg & Sellier, 2010
- with Luigi Luca Cavalli-Sforza, Razzismo e noismo. Le declinazioni del noi e l'esclusione dell'altro, Einaudi, 2013
- (editor) Niente di questo mondo ci risulta indifferente, Interno4 Edizioni, 2020
