= Founders of the European Union =

Founders of the European Union may refer to:

- Founding fathers of the European Union
- Founding members of the European Union
