= Ursula Hirschmann =

German activist (1913–1991)

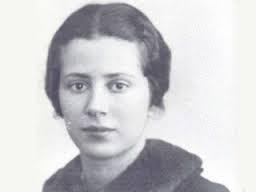
- Born: 2 September 1913; Berlin, Kingdom of Prussia, German Empire
- Died: 8 January 1991 (aged 77); Rome, Italy
- Resting place: Protestant Cemetery, Rome
- Education: Humboldt University Berlin
- Spouses: Eugenio Colorni (m. 1935; died 1944) Altiero Spinelli (m. 1945; died 1986)
- Children: 6, including Eva Colorni and Barbara Spinelli

Ursula Hirschmann (2 September 1913 – 8 January 1991) was a German anti-fascist activist and a founding advocate of the European Federalist Movement.

== Life and career ==
Hirschmann was born into a middle-class Jewish family to Carl Hirschmann and Hedwig Marcuse in Berlin. She studied economics at Humboldt University of Berlin together with her brother Albert O. Hirschman, later a candidate for the Nobel Prize. In 1932, she joined the youth organization of the Social Democratic Party, the Workers Socialist Youth, to participate in the resistance against the advance of the Nazis.

In the summer of 1933, she followed her brother to Paris. She joined the Communist Party, but cut her ties when her Comintern handler asked her to spy on her family friend Rafael Abramovitch Rein. In 1935 she re-contacted Eugenio Colorni, a young Italian philosopher and socialist whom she had already met in Berlin. She accepted his invitation to Trieste, where Colorni worked as a professor in a women's lyceum, and she married him in his hometown of Milan that December. They had three daughters: Silvia, Renata, and Eva.

The couple of Hirschmann and Colorni were engaged in the clandestine anti-fascist opposition. In the autumn of 1938, Colorni was arrested in Trieste and sent to confinement in Milan and then the island of Ventotene. Hirschmann followed her husband there, but as she was not herself held in confinement, she could travel back to the mainland.

Among the other prisoners and friends of Colorni on Ventotene were Ernesto Rossi and Altiero Spinelli, who in 1941, co-authored the famous Ventotene Manifesto "for a free and united Europe", i. e., an early sketch of a post-war democratic European Union. Hirschmann managed to bring the text of the manifesto to the mainland and took part in its dissemination. On 27 and 28 August 1943, she participated in the foundation of the European Federalist Movement in Milan.

Having escaped from Melfi in 1943 after a transfer from Ventotene, Colorni was murdered by fascists in Rome in May 1944. Thereafter, Spinelli became her second husband and adopted her daughters. The couple went to Switzerland, and from there to Rome, where they settled after the war. They had three daughters: Diana, Barbara, and Sara Spinelli.

In 1975, Hirschmann founded the Association Femmes pour l'Europe in Brussels, then in December of that year, suffered from a cerebral haemorrhage, followed by aphasia, from which she was never to recover completely.

== Bibliography ==
- Adelman, Jeremy (2013). Worldly Philosopher: The Odyssey of Albert O. Hirschman. Princeton, NJ: Princeton University Press. ISBN 978-0691155678. OCLC 820123478.
- Boccanfuso, Silvana (2019). Ursula Hirschmann. Una donna per l'Europa. Genova: Ed. Ultima Spiaggia. ISBN 9788898607280.
- Rosi Braidotti (2002). Gender, identity and multiculturalism in Europe: 1st Ursula Hirschmann annual lecture on "Gender and Europe": 8 May 2001. Firenze: European University Institute. OCLC 847285173.
- Eugenio Colorni, Luca Meldolesi and Ursula Hirschmann (2016). Microfondamenta: passi scelti dell'epistolario. Soveria Mannelli. OCLC 985330035.
- Ursula Hirschmann (1993). Noi senzapatria. Bologna: Il Mulino. OCLC 31611610.
- Fabio Masini and Roberto Castaldi (2012). Federalismo: proposte di riforma della convivenza civile. Firenze: Il Ponte. OCLC 883531553.
- Luisa Passerini; Federica Turco (2013). Donne per l'Europa. Torino: Rosenberg & Sellier. OCLC 848752982.
- Maria Pia Di Nonno and Sapienza Università di Roma (2017). Le madri fondatrici dell'Europa. Roma: Nuova cultura. ISBN 9788868129156. OCLC 1045969693.
- Senato della Repubblica (2017). Donne che hanno fatto l'Europa (PDF). Roma: Senato della Repubblica.
