= European College of Parma =

Higher education institution

European College of Parma Foundation
- Fondazione Collegio Europeo di Parma
- Type: Foundation
- Established: Established in 1988
- Rector: President: Cesare Azzali
- Administrative staff: 7
- Location: Parma https://en.wikipedia.org/wiki/Parma, Italy
- Website: www.europeancollege.it

The European College of Parma Foundation (Italian: Fondazione Collegio Europeo di Parma, French: La Fondation Collège Européen de Parme) is a higher education institution which provides academic training for young European graduates in the field of European Union law, economics and politics. The educational programme offered by the European College of Parma is a comprehensive, interdisciplinary academic curriculum covering the process of European integration.

The educational programme provided by the European College is geared to preparing students for careers in EU, national and local institutions, professional associations, the corporate world and private practice.

The first unit of the college was created in 1988 as a consortium of institutions, by the will of the institutions of the territory of Parma and the Emilia-Romagna Region in order to offer a higher education institute which promoted knowledge on the functioning of EU institutions.

== Academics ==
The current offer consists of an interdisciplinary academic curriculum on the process of European integration. The Advanced Diploma in European Studies (ADES), later re-named Diploma and University Master in Advanced European Studies, and again recently named "Master in European Studies" (MAES), was launched on 27 September 2003 with the inauguration of the first academic year by the then President of European Commission, Romano Prodi. In 2004 the College got the legal form of foundation.

== Promotions ==
Since 2003, similarly to what happens at the College of Europe in Bruges and Natolin, each academic year is called "promotion".

Promotions are dedicated to prominent personalities that have contributed to the European integration.

Academic Year	Name of the Promotion	Speaker at the lectio inauguralis
2003/2004	Alcide De Gasperi	Romano Prodi
2004/2005	Paul-Henri Spaak	Étienne Davignon
2005/2006	Giovanni Paolo II	Franco Frattini
2006/2007	Konrad Adenauer	Mario Monti
2007/2008	Robert Schuman	José Manuel Durão Barroso
2008/2009	Jean Monnet	Giorgio Napolitano
2009/2010	Altiero Spinelli	Pascal Lamy
2010/2011	François Mitterrand	Herman Van Rompuy
2011/2012	Willy Brandt	Jerzy Buzek
2012/2013	Luigi Einaudi	Vassilios Skouris
2013/2014	Erasmus	
2014/2015	Jacques Le Goff	
2015/2016	Pericles	Dimitris Avramopoulos
2016/2017	Alfonso Mattera	
2017/2018	Ortega y Gasset	
2018/2019	Charlemagne	
2019/2020	Hugo Grotious	
2020/2021	Marie Curie	
2021/2022	David Sassoli	
