= Toward European Unity =

1947 essay by George Orwell

- Author: George Orwell
- Language: English
- Subject: European integration, totalitarianism
- Genre: Essay
- Publisher: Partisan Review
- Publication date: July–August 1947
- OCLC: 549327968

Toward European Unity was a 1947 essay by George Orwell on the subject of European integration. In the essay, Orwell speculated about possible futures in which the world could fall to nuclear war or totalitarianism. He proposed the creation of a democratic socialist European Union as an alternative to such scenarios, although he also predicted that it would have to overcome opposition from imperial powers.

The essay represented both the culmination of Orwell's optimistic visions for a socialist future, which he had developed since the Spanish Civil War, as well as the beginning of his shift towards a deep-rooted pessimism that informed his dystopian novel Nineteen Eighty-Four.

== Background ==
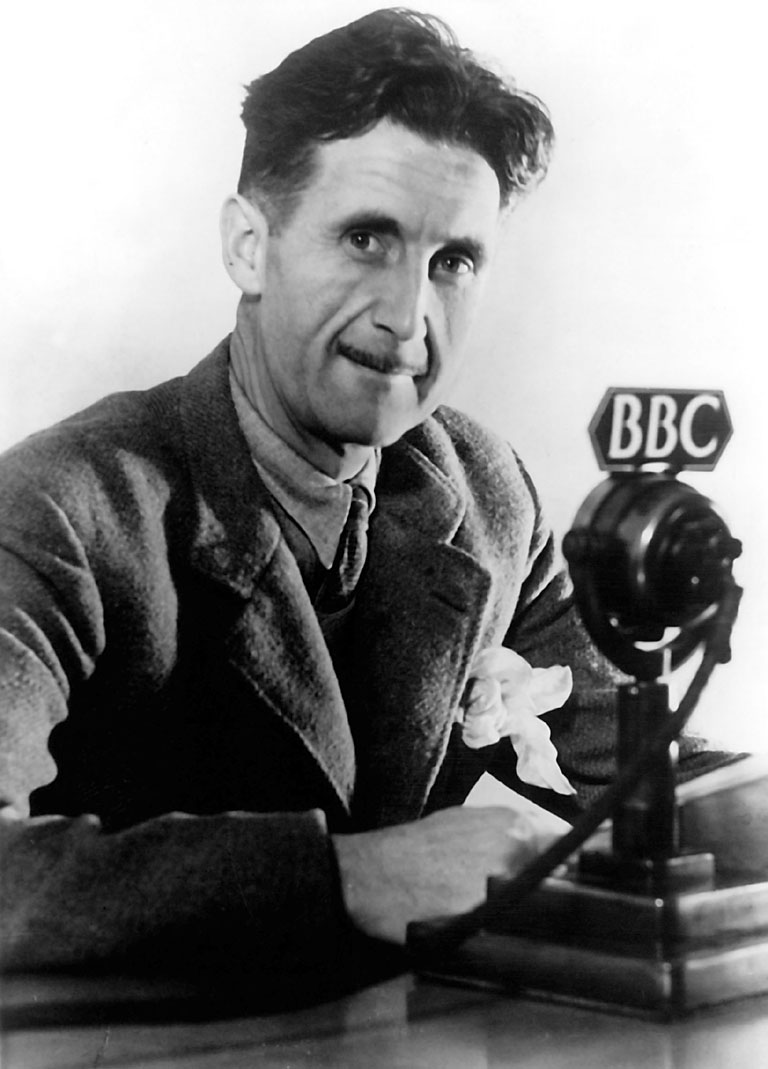
Orwell broadcasting for the BBC, during World War II

Orwell began his political career as an unaligned anti-fascist, which drove him to fight in the Spanish Civil War, during which he developed sympathies for socialism and an opposition to totalitarianism. In Homage to Catalonia, he described the prevailing atmosphere of social equality that he experienced in the country; directly contrasting this "authentic socialism" with the authoritarian socialist practices of state control. He believed that, in the Soviet Union, a "new form of class privilege" had been established by the Stalinists under the "sham" pretext of collectivism and egalitarianism. Orwell came to identify all authoritarians, both fascists and state socialists, as enemies of his vision of democratic socialism. His experiences in the war, during which the Catholic Church collaborated with the Nationalists, also instilled in Orwell a deep sense of anti-Catholicism; he came to conclude the Catholic Church was inherently sympathetic to fascism and an obstacle to the establishment of socialism.

By the outbreak of World War II, he was already preoccupied with "visions of a totalitarian future". Nevertheless, Orwell momentarily continued to uphold his optimistic vision of socialism; in "Second Thoughts on James Burnham", a review of the titular author's works on managerialism, he criticised Burnham for his conservatism and pessimism. But by the end of World War II, Orwell's health was deteriorating and his wife Eileen Blair had died. He subsequently retired to the Inner Hebrides of Scotland and slowly fell into a state of social isolation. He became increasingly aligned with Burnham's predictions of a new highly-stratified managerial society, which he worried would coalesce into hegemonic superstates each vying for world domination. He considered the world wars to have been the result of this desire for world domination, which he believed had been set in place since the beginning of the Industrial Revolution, and concluded of the necessity for socialists to reshape the material basis of industrial society.

After the post-war government of Clement Attlee was elected in the United Kingdom, Orwell prominently criticised it for failing to establish socialism after the war, noting it had focused only on minor democratic reforms. He condemned the Attlee government for having, in his view, subordinated Britain to the United States, handed Eastern Europe over to Russian imperialism and betrayed its promise of decolonisation. Although previously critical of cosmopolitanism, following the war, Orwell had moved towards Europeanism. A member of the left wing of the Labour Party, Orwell aligned himself against the British Left's proposals for Britain to become a "third force" on the international stage, as he supported the dissolution of the British Empire and the establishment of a socialist European Union.

His perspective thus began to move away from a localised British socialism and towards an internationalist view of pan-European socialism. As a left-libertarian, he criticised the bureaucratic tendencies of the British left, believing it lacked the courage to end the exploitation of industrialism and imperialism, and the imagination to establish a United States of Europe. Orwell believed that pan-European democratic socialism served as the best alternative to the "false kind[s] of socialism" presented by British left-wing intellectuals and believers in Soviet socialism. He argued that British socialists, who emphasised democracy and non-violent change, could become the leaders of a pan-European socialist movement against both capitalism and communism. He thus concluded that British xenophobia presented one of the greatest challenges to pan-European socialism and argued that Britons "must stop despising foreigners. They are Europeans, and ought to be aware of it."

As the Cold War began to take shape and Orwell grew increasingly disillusioned with the Attlee government, he gradually lost his optimism for a socialist future and began to accept that a professional–managerial class was on the rise. The events since the end of World War II persuaded him that totalitarianism had not yet been defeated, with both the United States and the Soviet Union demonstrating totalitarian tendencies. He began to think that socialist alternatives to a totalitarian future were unlikely. Following a visit to post-war Germany and witnessing the destruction caused by the war, he wrote of his rejection of the Morgenthau Plan and his belief that a European Federation should take over the reconstruction of Germany. In July 1947, he published his thoughts on the matter in the essay "Toward European Unity" in Partisan Review, as a contribution to the journal's series on "The Future of Socialism". Orwell's essay was the fourth in the series, following articles by the American anti-communists Sidney Hook, Granville Hicks and Arthur M. Schlesinger Jr., and preceding an article from Victor Serge about socialist humanism.

== Content ==
Orwell opened the essay by taking on the role of a physician, aiming to keep the socialist movement alive and aid its recovery. He insisted that socialists ought to always take action under the assumption that socialism can be established, although he admitted that the odds were not in their favour. He estimated the probability of the survival of civilisation over the 20th and 21st centuries, which he judged to be quite low due to the advancement of nuclear proliferation.

Orwell speculated about the possible scenarios for the future of the European continent. In the first scenario, the United States as the sole global nuclear power could wage a preventive war with the Soviet Union; he worried this would give rise to new empires and further inter-imperialist wars, although he believed it unlikely due to lingering democratic tendencies in the United States. In the second scenario, other countries could develop their own nuclear weapons and wage nuclear warfare against each other, causing societal collapse; he remarked that, although a return to pre-industrial society could be considered a desirable outcome, it was not cogent for the establishment of socialism. In the third scenario, the status quo would be frozen and the world divided between a few large superpowers, which would each be highly stratified and totalitarian states. Orwell believed the third to be the most likely and the worst possible outcome, worrying this scenario could last for thousands of years and prevent the establishment of a worldwide political consensus.

As an alternative to this future, Orwell proposed the unification of western Europe under a system of democratic socialism. He believed that the establishment of a free and equal society on a large scale, in which there existed no incentive to pursue power or profit, was only possible through the creation of a federal Europe. This would thus have necessitated the abolition of the sovereignty of individual nation states, in order to create a socialist federation across national boundaries. He argued that such a democratic socialism, with its emphasis on liberty, social equality and internationalism, was only possible to establish in Europe as it still appealed to large numbers of Europeans in Austria, Czechoslovakia, France, Italy, the Netherlands, Spain, Switzerland and the United Kingdom. In contrast, he believed that socialism had not developed a foothold in Africa, Asia and Latin America. In Orwell's mind, a European socialist federation would be a way for Europe to maintain its independence from the hegemony of both American capitalism and Soviet-style communism. He believed this would require the end of European states' colonial relationship with African and Middle Eastern, which as equal partners rather than dependencies, could help Europe become self-sufficient and resist both American and Russian imperialism. He also believed that, although socialism would ultimately need to be established world-wide, it would first have to be established in a single location and Europe seemed to him to be the best option. He therefore held the creation of a socialist European federation to be the only political objective of his time that was worth pursuing.

He saw the main internal obstacle to European unity to be the conservatism and apathy held by many Europeans, and lamented people's "inability to imagine anything new". He in turn foresaw four potential external dangers to a socialist European federation. First he named the Soviet Union, which he believed would desire to keep Europe under its control, either through invasion or through its influence over the various European communist parties. Second he named the United States, which he saw as hostile to any form of socialism, although he believed it would be more likely to use economic pressure than military intervention. He worried that the US would attempt to break up a European Union by "drawing Britain out of it". He cautioned that the United Kingdom would be most susceptible to American economic pressure, as he considered it to be a de facto dependent territory of the United States, and proposed that the UK could break free from American hegemony by "dropping its attempt to be an extra-European power". Third he mentioned the continuation of imperialism and support for it among the working class, as he believed the exploitation of colonial possessions had prevented Europeans from building socialism in their own countries. He specifically mentioned the end of British colonial rule in India as a necessary prerequisite to establishing socialism, and predicted that decolonisation would inevitably involve a change in outlook on the one hand and violent struggle on the other. Finally he named the Catholic Church, which Orwell saw as an enemy of freedom of thought, social equality and societal reform.

Orwell believed that the collapse of capitalism was inevitable, but could not predict what might follow in its wake. Although he considered the establishment of a socialist European federation to be unlikely, as those advocating for it did not have the strength to implement it, he suggested a number of optimistic outcomes for the continent. He predicted that the United States might move towards socialism, while cautioning that the next great change in the politics of the United States might be reactionary. He also foresaw a potential future in which Russia underwent democratisation, after millions of Soviet citizens grew tired of the old regime and sought to gain liberty. He also believed that in such a case where totalitarianism was established, the liberal tradition in the Anglosphere would be able to move society forward and improve people's lives. Despite the possibility of such scenarios occurring, he concluded that "the actual outlook, so far as I can calculate the probabilities, is very dark, and any serious thought should start from that fact".

== Analysis ==
At the time of the essay's publication, many read it as an invective against the pro-Americanism expressed by Ernest Bevin, the Foreign Secretary under the Attlee government. Orwell himself intended to put his plan into action by convincing British socialists to take the initiative in promoting pan-European socialism, first amongst each other then to the rest of Europe. Although a Europe Group was formed within the Labour Party to promote unification with other European socialist parties, Orwell found that the idea did not gain much traction due to a number of "practical and psychological difficulties". He nevertheless remained convinced that it was possible to establish a socialist European federation, so long as people desired to create it and a decade or two of peace allowed the idea to develop. Australian foreign policy expert Owen Harries characterised Orwell's proposal for a socialist Europe, in which it acted as a counterweight to American and Russian hegemony, as a form of Third-worldism. Literary scholar Peter W. Graham commented that Orwell had accurately predicted the world of the late-20th century, as a cold war between equally matched super-powers. On the other hand, Scottish academic Graham MacPhee criticised Orwell's essay for Eurocentrism and Anglocentrism.

"Toward European Unity" also marked a turning point for Orwell, from his previous socialistic optimism to an ever-increasing pessimism. Although he continued to press for the establishment of a democratic socialist European Federation, which he considered essential for "the future of humanity", he came to view such as project as increasingly improbable towards the end of his life. The publication of his novel Nineteen Eighty-Four marked the culmination of this pessimism, going further than either his essay on European integration or even Burnham's own predictions of a managerial revolution. Burnham's conception of managerialism ultimately provided the foundation for Orwell's totalitarian dystopia in Nineteen Eighty-Four. Orwell's worries about the world dividing into a few totalitarian superpowers, expressed in "Toward European Unity", also formed the basis for the book's political geography. In the book, Britain had become an American outpost for a global war against a Eurasian superstate. His original title for the book was The Last Man in Europe.

Despite being a clear elaboration of Orwell's politics in the post-war period, the essay has largely been ignored or overlooked by his commentators, particularly those in the United States. According to British historian John Newsinger, the essay demonstrated Orwell's commitment to socialism during the final years of his life and his desire to establish an alternative to the existing system. In 2013, Alistair Davies and Peter Saunders wrote that Orwell's proposals in the essay would be just as challenging to implement in the modern day as they were in his own time. Writing for The Atlantic, Krishnadev Calamur compared Orwell's arguments in the essay to David Cameron's rhetoric during the 2016 Brexit referendum; Cameron argued that Britain could better face the threats of terrorism and climate change, grow its own economy and establish better trade relationships, if it did so together with other European countries. Calamur also noted that Eastern Europeans, Africans and Middle Easterners, whose immigration to the UK had been denounced by pro-Brexit campaigners, were included in Orwell's pro-European vision. Irish writer Colin Graham compares the ideals of the European Union to Orwell's democratic socialist vision, while noting that it in practice had adopted a more centre-right politics. He also wrote that Orwell had foreseen a version of Brexit, in which, following the collapse of its empire, Britain had turned away from Europe to willingly subordinate itself to the US under Donald Trump.

== See also ==
- Ventotene Manifesto

== Bibliography ==
- Amenta, Edwin (1987). "Compromising Possessions: Orwell's Political, Analytical, and Literary Purposes in Nineteen Eighty-Four". Politics & Society. 15 (2): 157–188. doi:10.1177/003232928701500203. ISSN 0032-3292.
- Bance, A. (1992). "The Idea of Europe: from Erasmus to ERASMUS". Journal of European Studies. 22 (1): 1–19. doi:10.1177/004724419202200101.
- Bishop Rogers, Gayle (2008). British Modernism and Ortega's Spanish Vanguard: Cosmopolitan Visions of Europe, 1922-39 (PhD). Northwestern University. doi:10.21985/N2VT76. ProQuest 3303716.
- Bowker, Gordon (2004) [2003]. "The Nightmare and the Novel". George Orwell. Abacus. pp. 366–390. ISBN 0-349-11551-6.
- Calamur, Krishnadev (23 June 2016). "Brexit: What Would George Orwell Do?". The Atlantic. ISSN 2151-9463. Archived from the original on 23 June 2016.
- Callaghan, John; Phythian, Mark (2015). "Intellectuals of the Left and the Atomic Dilemma in the Age of the US Atomic Monopoly, 1945–1949". Contemporary British History. 29 (4): 441–463. doi:10.1080/13619462.2014.987530. hdl:2381/31584. ISSN 1361-9462.
- Claeys, Gregory (1985). "The Lion and the Unicorn, Patriotism, and Orwell's Politics". The Review of Politics. 47 (2): 186–211. doi:10.1017/S003467050003669X. ISSN 0034-6705.
- Cole, Matthew B. (2023). "The Desperate Radicalism of Orwell's 1984: Power, Socialism, and Utopia in Dystopian Times". Political Research Quarterly. 76 (1): 267–278. doi:10.1177/10659129221083286. ISSN 1065-9129.
- Davies, Alistair; Saunders, Peter (2013) [1983]. "Literature, Politics and Society". In Sinfield, Alan (ed.). Society and Literature. Routledge. pp. 13–50. ISBN 9781135021382.
- Farrant, Andrew; Baughman, Jonathan; McPhail, Edward (2018). "Hayek, Orwell, and the Road to Nineteen Eighty-Four?". In Leeson, Robert (ed.). Hayek: A Collaborative Biography. Archival Insights into the Evolution of Economics. Vol. XIV. Palgrave Macmillan. pp. 153–173. doi:10.1007/978-3-319-94412-8_4. ISBN 978-3-319-94411-1.
- Farrell, John (2023). "George Orwell's Dystopian Socialism" (PDF). The Utopian Dilemma in the Western Political Imagination. Routledge. pp. 173–193. doi:10.4324/9781003365945-17. ISBN 978-1-032-43157-4.
- Feigel, Lara; Miller, Alisa (2020). "'This is something which we know, in our bones, we cannot do': hopes and fears for a united Europe in Britain after the Second World War". In Habermann, Ina (ed.). The Road to Brexit: A Cultural Perspective on British Attitudes to Europe. Manchester University Press. pp. 44–68. ISBN 978-1-5261-4508-6.
- Graham, Peter W. (2016). "Byron, Orwell, politics and the English language". In Beaton, Roderick; Kenyon Jones, Christine (eds.). Byron: The Poetry of Politics and the Politics of Poetry. Routledge. pp. 69–79. doi:10.4324/9781315570686-7. ISBN 9781315570686.
- Graham, Colin (10 April 2017). "Orwell's 1984 and the idea of Europe". Irish Humanities. Archived from the original on 30 June 2018.
- Harries, Owen (1993). "The Collapse of 'The West'". Foreign Affairs. 72 (4): 41–53. doi:10.2307/20045714. ISSN 0015-7120. JSTOR 20045714.
- Kateb, George (December 1966). "The Road to 1984". Political Science Quarterly. 81 (4): 564–580. doi:10.2307/2146905. ISSN 0032-3195. JSTOR 2146905.
- Lowe, Peter (2009). "Resistance and Rebuilding: The Wartime Writings of George Orwell and Albert Camus". English Studies. 90 (3): 305–327. doi:10.1080/00138380902796649. ISSN 0013-838X.
- MacPhee, Graham (2011). "Rethinking the End of Empire". Postwar British Literature and Postcolonial Studies. Edinburgh University Press. pp. 6–69. ISBN 978-0748647125.
- Newsinger, John (1999a). "A Doctor Treating an All but Hopeless Case". Orwell's Politics. Palgrave Macmillan. pp. 136–154. doi:10.1057/9780333983607_7. ISBN 978-0-333-96858-1.
- Newsinger, John (2016). ""The lesser evil": Orwell and America" (PDF). George Orwell Studies. 1 (1): 1–20. ISSN 2399-1267.
- Rodden, John (1984). "Orwell on Religion: The Catholic and Jewish Questions". College Literature. 11 (1): 44–58. ISSN 0093-3139. JSTOR 25111578.
- Rothbard, Murray (1986). "George Orwell and the Cold War: A Reconsideration". In Mulvihill, Robert (ed.). Reflections on America, 1984: An Orwell Symposium. University of Georgia Press. pp. 5–14. ISBN 0820307785.
- Shaw, Tony (2004). "'Some Writers are More Equal than Others': George Orwell, the State and Cold War Privilege". In Major, Patrick; Mitter, Rana (eds.). Across the Blocs: Exploring Comparative Cold War Cultural and Social History. Routledge. doi:10.4324/9780203307403-7. ISBN 9780203307403.
- Simms, Valerie J. (1974). "A Reconsideration of Orwell's 1984: The Moral Implications of Despair". Ethics. 84 (4): 292–306. doi:10.1086/291927. ISSN 0014-1704.
- Vaninskaya, Anna (2003). "Janus-Faced Fictions: Socialism as Utopia and Dystopia in William Morris and George Orwell". Utopian Studies. 14 (2): 83–98. ISSN 1045-991X. JSTOR 20720012.
