= The Idea of Justice =

2009 book by Amartya Sen

- Cover of the first edition
- Author: Amartya Sen
- Language: English
- Subject: A Theory of Justice
- Publisher: Allen Lane & Harvard University Press
- Publication date: 2009
- Publication place: India
- Media type: Print (Hardcover and Paperback)
- Pages: 304
- ISBN: 978-1-84614-147-8
- OCLC: 368046398

The Idea of Justice is a 2009 book by the economist Amartya Sen. The work is a critique and revision of the philosopher John Rawls's A Theory of Justice (1971).

== Summary ==
The book is principally a critique and revision of John Rawls's basic ideas in A Theory of Justice (1971). Sen drew extensively upon Rawls's work, mostly composed while Sen was a professor in India. Sen dedicated The Idea of Justice to the memory of Rawls. In summarizing the work, S.R. Osmani writes;

Do we need a theory of justice at all? if the answer is yes, How should we develop such a theory that could help practical people to move towards a more just world? These are main concerns of Amartya Sen in this book.

In the book, Sen makes a radical break with the traditional notion of homo economicus, or 'rational economic man' as motivated mainly by self-interest. He points out that children have strong notions of fairness and acute aversion to manifest injustice. In his introduction to The Idea of Justice, Sen states that "the strong perception of manifest injustice applies to adult human beings as well (as children). What moves us, reasonably enough, is not the realization that the world falls short of being completely just – which few of us expect – but that there are clearly remediable injustices around us which we want to eliminate."

Thus, Sen asserts that Human Beings are as concerned with eliminating remediable injustice as they are with pursuing their own self-interest.

This assertion has a natural corollary. Since human beings have an innate desire to eliminate injustice where possible, institutions are not that important. Ideal institutions are not required to inculcate a sense of fairness or to persuade people to act fairly or to very strictly police them so as to prevent transgressive behaviour. Since ideal institutions aren't necessary and since people have an innate desire to eliminate remediable injustice, it follows that 'Public Reason'—i.e., open discussion and rational argument—can enable what Sen calls 'plural grounding', this being an 'overlapping consensus' (in Rawls's terminology) between people of different ideologies or belief or value systems such that people can agree upon comparative evaluations regarding justice without having to agree about all their values and beliefs.

One of Sen's main arguments is that the project of social justice should not be evaluated in binary terms, as either achieved or not. Rather, he claims that justice should be understood as existing to a matter of degree, and should correspondingly be evaluated along a continuum. Furthermore, he argues that we do not need a fully established abstract ideal of justice to evaluate the fairness of different institutions. He claims that we can meaningfully compare the level of justice in two institutions without positing an ideal, transcendental idea of justice. He names the opposite position transcendental institutionalism.

Sen defends one of Rawls's most fundamental theoretical concepts: justice as fairness. Although this is a vague notion fraught with difficulties in any particular case, he nevertheless views it as one of Rawls's strongest insights while rejecting the necessity of Rawls's two principles of justice emerging from the original position thought experiment in A Theory of Justice.

He credits Rawls for revitalizing the interest in the ideas of what justice means and the stress put on fairness, objectivity, equality of opportunity, removal of poverty, and freedom. However, Sen, as part of his general critique of the contractarian tradition, states that ideas about a perfectly just world do not help redress actual existing inequality. Sen faults Rawls for overemphasizing institutions as guarantors of justice and not considering the effects of human behaviour on the institutions' ability to maintain a just society. Sen believes Rawls understates the difficulty in getting everyone in society to adhere to the norms of a just society. He also claims that Rawls' position that there be only one possible outcome of the reflective equilibrium behind the veil of ignorance is misguided. In contrast to Rawls, Sen believes that multiple conflicting, yet just, principles may arise and that this undermines the multistep processes that Rawls laid out as leading to a perfectly just society.

Sen also draws heavily on Adam Smith and his first major work The Theory of Moral Sentiments (1759), arguing that it is Smith's most important and unduly overlooked work.

== Reception ==
The Idea of Justice has been described by The Economist as a "commanding summation of Mr Sen’s own work on economic reasoning and on the elements and measurement of human well-being".
