= European Federalist Movement =

Organization

Movimento Federalista Europeo
- The 1948 designed European federalist "E"-symbol
- Founded: 27/28 August 1943
- Founder: Altiero Spinelli
- Type: INGO
- Headquarters: Pavia, Italy
- Location: Italy
- Fields: European federalism
- President: Giorgio Anselmi
- Website: mfe.it

The European Federalist Movement (Movimento Federalista Europeo, MFE) was founded in Milan in 1943 by a group of activists led by Altiero Spinelli. The principles which inspired its foundation are contained in the Ventotene Manifesto, drawn up in 1941 by Spinelli himself, Eugenio Colorni, Ursula Hirschmann and Ernesto Rossi, and circulated by the in May 1943 circulated L'Unità europea periodical. Vayssière notes that the manifesto is widely seen as the birth of European federalism. Spinelli (1907–86), a former Communist, became a leader of the federalist movement due to his primary authorship of the Manifesto and his postwar advocacy. The manifesto called for a break with Europe's past to form a new political system through a restructuring of politics and extensive social reform. It was presented not as an ideal, but as the best option for the Europe's postwar condition.

Federalism represented in the 1940s a revolutionary and entirely innovative political idea. According to the federalists, the new line between progressive and reactionary forces was the one that existed between those for whom the key task is to create a federal European state, and those who consciously or de facto acted to maintain a diversity of sovereign nation-states.

== See also ==
- Union of European Federalists
