= Amartya Sen =

Indian economist and Nobel laureate (born 1933)

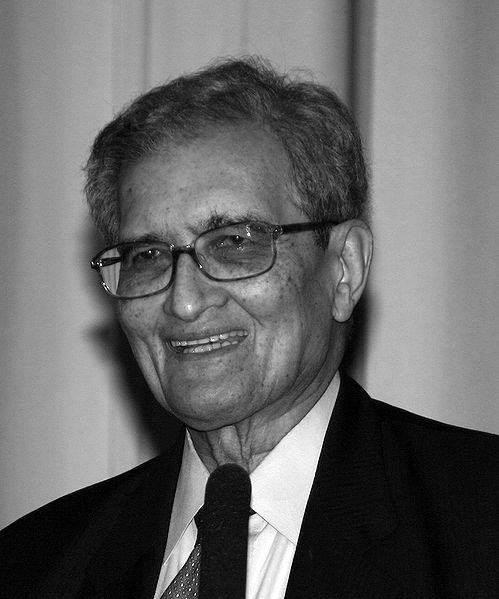
- Sen in 2007
- Born: Amartya Kumar Sen; 3 November 1933 (age 93); Santiniketan, Bengal, British India
- Spouses: Nabaneeta Dev (m. 1958; div. 1976) Eva Colorni (m. 1978; died 1985) Emma Rothschild (m. 1991)
- Children: 4, including Nandana and Antara
- Awards: Nobel Memorial Prize in Economic Sciences (1998); Bharat Ratna (1999); National Humanities Medal (2011); Johan Skytte Prize (2017)

Academic background
- Education: St. Gregory's High School and College (Primary School); Patha Bhavana, Santiniketan (PUC); Presidency College, Calcutta (BA); Trinity College, Cambridge (BA, MA, PhD)
- Doctoral advisor: Joan Robinson
- Influences: Gautama Buddha; Adam Smith; John Rawls; John Maynard Keynes; B. R. Ambedkar; Kenneth Arrow; Piero Sraffa; Maurice Dobb; Mary Wollstonecraft; Karl Marx

Academic work
- Discipline: Economics; philosophy
- Sub-discipline: Welfare economics; development economics
- School or tradition: Capability approach
- Institutions: Jadavpur University; Trinity College, Cambridge; Delhi University; London School of Economics; Nuffield College, Oxford; All Souls College, Oxford; Harvard University
- Doctoral students: Lawrence Hamilton; Ravi Kanbur; Felicia Knaul; Prasanta Pattanaik; Ingrid Robeyns
- Notable works: Development as Freedom (1999); The Idea of Justice (2009)
- Notable ideas: Capability approach; human development theory; entitlement approach to famine
- Influenced: Sabina Alkire; Jean-Louis Arcand; Tim Besley; Jean Drèze; Robin Hahnel; Inge Kaul; M. A. Oommen; Thomas Piketty; Max Roser; Lars Pålsson Syll
- Amartya Sen's voice Sen speaking on the BBC programme Start the Week in 2013

Amartya Kumar Sen (Bengali: [ˈɔmortːo ˈʃen]; born 3 November 1933) is an Indian economist and philosopher. Sen has taught and worked in England and the United States since 1972. In 1998, he received the Nobel Prize in Economic Sciences for his contributions to welfare economics. He has also made major contributions to social choice theory, economic and social justice, economic theories of famines, decision theory, development economics, public health, and the measures of well-being of countries.

Sen is currently the Thomas W. Lamont University Professor, and professor of economics and philosophy, at Harvard University. He previously served as master of Trinity College at the University of Cambridge. In 1999, he received India's highest civilian honour, Bharat Ratna, for his contribution to welfare economics. The German Publishers and Booksellers Association awarded him the 2020 Peace Prize of the German Book Trade for his pioneering scholarship addressing issues of global justice and combating social inequality in education and healthcare.

== Early life and education ==
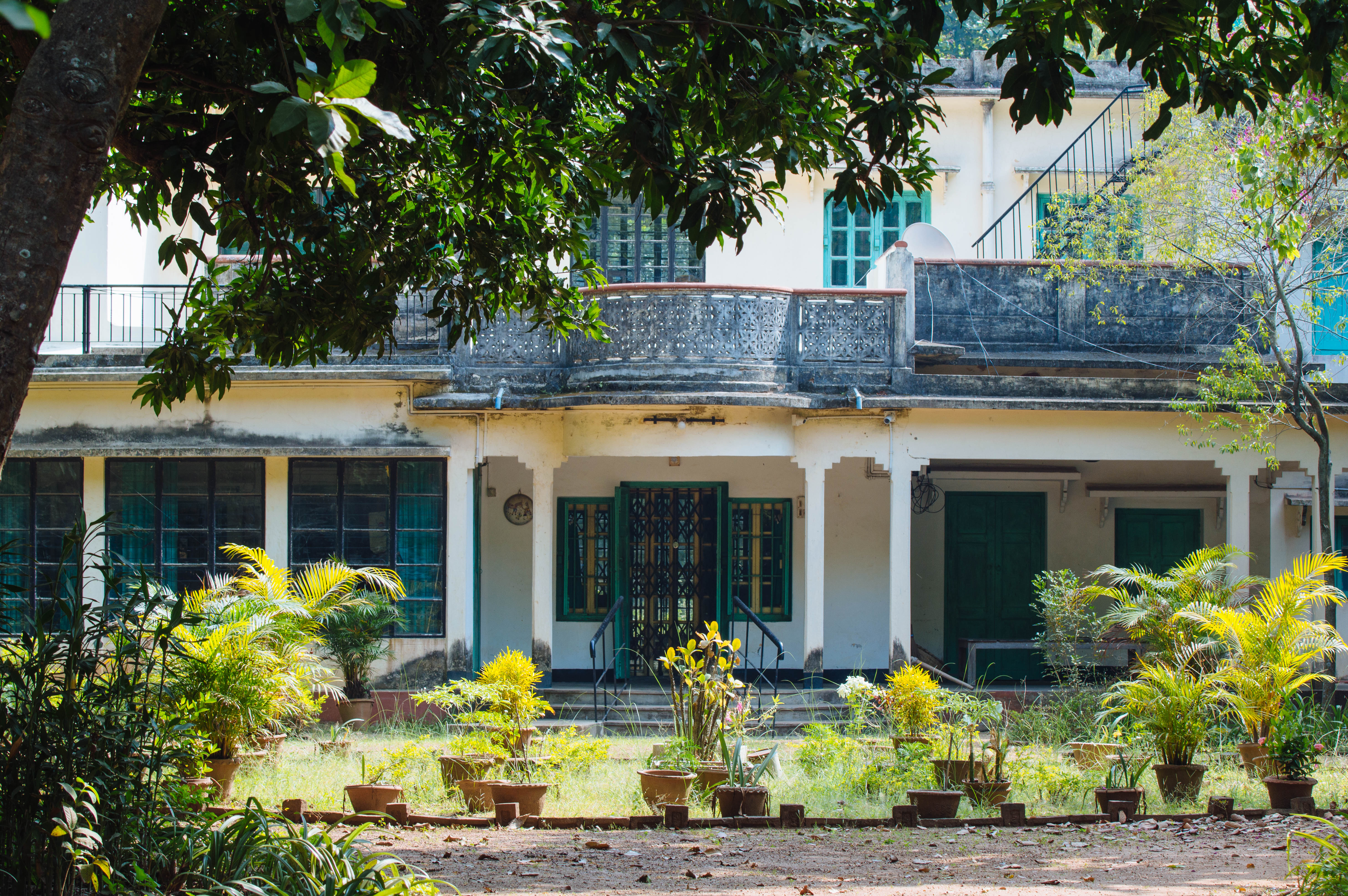
'Pratichi', Sen's house in Shantiniketan

Amartya Sen was born on 3 November 1933 in a Bengali Baidya family in Santiniketan, Bengal, British India. The first Asian to win a Nobel Prize, the polymath and writer Rabindranath Tagore, gave Amartya Sen his name (Bengali: অমর্ত্য, romanized: ômorto, lit. 'immortal or heavenly'). Sen's family was from Wari and Manikganj, Dhaka, both in present-day Bangladesh. His father, Ashutosh Sen, was a professor of chemistry at Dhaka University, then the development commissioner in Delhi, and then chairman of the West Bengal Public Service Commission. Sen moved with his family to West Bengal in 1945. Sen's mother, Amita Sen, was the daughter of Kshiti Mohan Sen, the eminent Sanskritist and scholar of ancient and medieval India. Sen's maternal grandfather was a close associate of Tagore. K.M. Sen served as the second vice-chancellor of Visva Bharati University from 1953 to 1954.

Sen began his school education at St Gregory's School in Dhaka in 1940. In the fall of 1941, he was admitted to Patha Bhavana, Santiniketan, where he completed his school education. The school had many progressive features, such as a distaste for examinations or competitive testing. In addition, the school stressed cultural diversity and embraced cultural influences from the rest of the world. In 1951, he went to Presidency College, Calcutta, where he earned a BA in economics with First in the First Class, with a minor in mathematics, as a graduating student of the University of Calcutta. While at Presidency, Sen was diagnosed with oral cancer and given a 15 per cent chance of living five years. With radiation treatment, he survived, and in 1953 he moved to Trinity College, Cambridge, where he earned a second BA in economics in 1955 with a first class, topping the list as well. At this time, he was elected president of the Cambridge Majlis. While Sen was officially a PhD student at Cambridge (though he had finished his research in 1955–56), he was offered the position of First-Professor and First-Head of the Economics Department of the newly created Jadavpur University in Calcutta. Appointed to the position at age 22, he is still the youngest chairman to have headed the Department of Economics. He served in that position, starting the new Economics Department, from 1956 to 1958.

Meanwhile, Sen was elected to a Prize Fellowship at Trinity College, which gave him four years to study any subject; he made the decision to study philosophy. Sen explained, "The broadening of my studies into philosophy was important for me not just because some of my main areas of interest in economics relate quite closely to philosophical disciplines (for example, social choice theory makes intense use of mathematical logic and also draws on moral philosophy, and so does the study of inequality and deprivation), but also because I found philosophical studies very rewarding on their own." His interest in philosophy, however, dates back to his college days at Presidency, where he read books on philosophy and debated philosophical themes. One of the books he was most interested in was Kenneth Arrow's Social Choice and Individual Values.

In Cambridge, there were major debates between supporters of Keynesian economics, and the neo-classical economists who were sceptical of Keynes. Because of a lack of enthusiasm for social choice theory in both Trinity and Cambridge, Sen chose a different subject for his PhD thesis, which was on "The Choice of Techniques" in 1959. The work had been completed earlier, except for advice from his adjunct supervisor in India, A. K. Dasgupta, given to Sen while teaching and revising his work at Jadavpur, under the supervision of the "brilliant but vigorously intolerant" post-Keynesian Joan Robinson. Quentin Skinner notes that Sen was a member of the secret society Cambridge Apostles during his time at Cambridge.

During 1960–61, Amartya Sen visited the Massachusetts Institute of Technology on leave from Trinity College.

== Research work ==
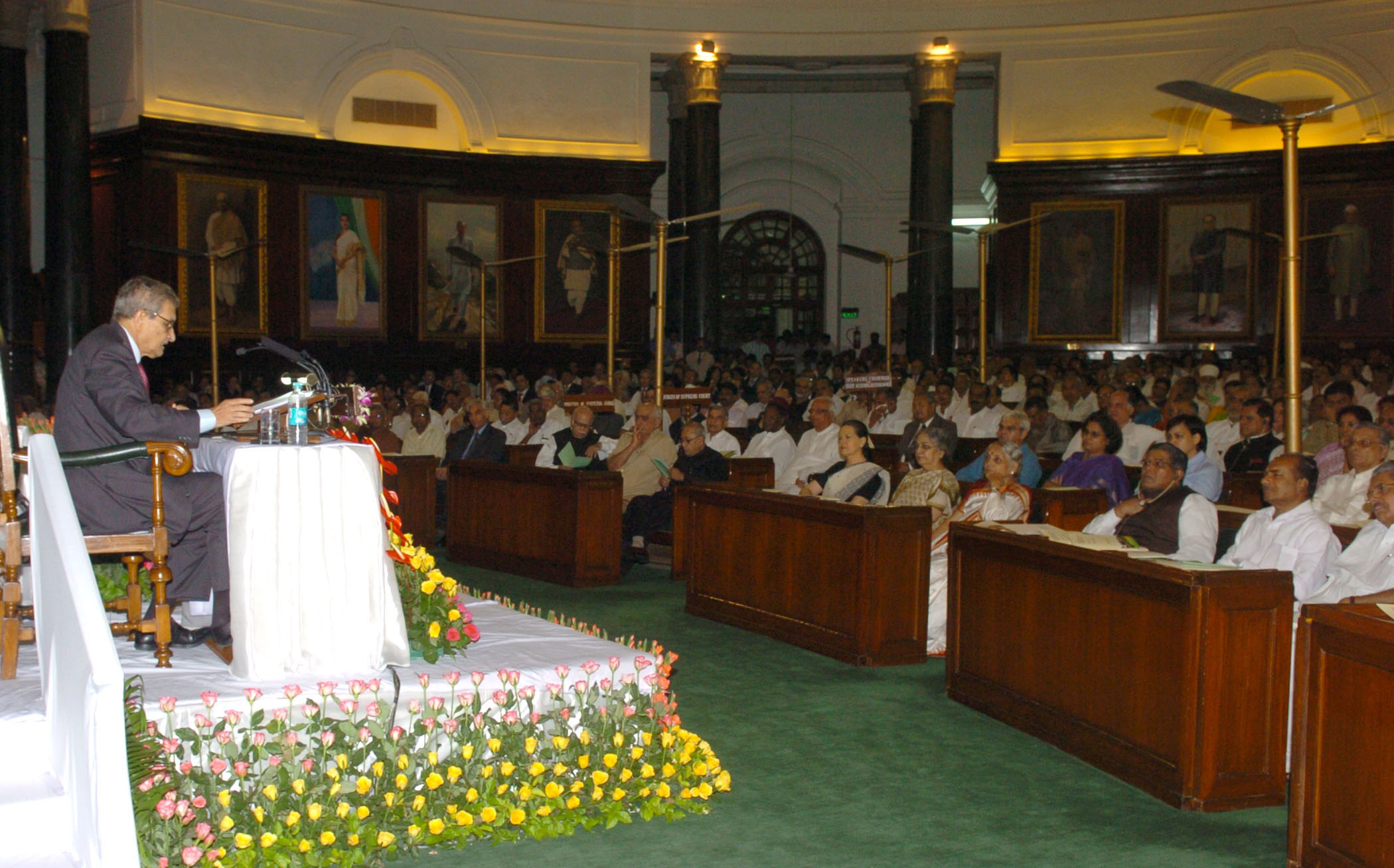
Sen giving the inaugural parliamentary lecture at Parliament House in New Delhi

=== Social choice theory ===
Sen's work on 'Choice of Techniques' complemented that of Maurice Dobb. In a developing country, the Dobb-Sen strategy relied on maximising investible surpluses, maintaining constant real wages, and using the entire increase in labour productivity, due to technological change, to raise the rate of accumulation. In other words, workers were expected to demand no improvement in their standard of living despite having become more productive. Sen's papers in the late 1960s and early 1970s helped develop the theory of social choice, which first came to prominence in the work by the American economist Kenneth Arrow. Arrow had most famously shown that when voters have three or more distinct alternatives (options), any ranked order voting system will, in at least some situations, inevitably conflict with what many assume to be basic democratic norms. Sen's contribution to the literature was to show under what conditions Arrow's impossibility theorem applied, as well as to extend and enrich the theory of social choice, informed by his interests in the history of economic thought and philosophy.

=== Liberal Paradox ===
In 1970, Sen published his paper "The Impossibility of a Paretian Liberal," which introduced the "liberal paradox", also sometimes referred to as "Sen's paradox." This paradox shows that no means of aggregating individual preferences into a single, social choice, can simultaneously fulfill the following, seemingly mild conditions: unrestricted domain, the weak Pareto principle, and a minimal requirement of individual rights. Pareto efficiency dictates that if every individual in a society prefers option A to option B, the society as a whole should also prefer A. Minimal liberalism suggests that individuals should have the decisive right to make choices in purely personal matters, such as what to read or how to dress.

Sen illustrated the result using a hypothetical example involving two individuals ("Lewd" and "Prude") and three social states: one person reading a particular book, the other reading, or neither reading. Prude thinks that the book is indecent and that it should be disposed of, unread. However, if someone must read it, Prude would prefer to read it rather than Lewd since Prude thinks it would be even worse for someone to read and enjoy the book rather than read it in disgust. Given these preferences of the two individuals in the society, a social planner must decide what to do. Should the planner force Lewd to read the book, force Prude to read the book, or let it go unread? Under this decisiveness assignment, society would generate cyclic collective preferences, violating acyclicity (or transitivity) of social ordering.

This paradox, now known as the "liberal paradox," demonstrates a conflict between individual rights and social efficiency: ensuring minimal individual liberty may force the violation of Pareto-style aggregation consistency.

=== Poverty and Famines (1981) ===
In 1981, Sen published Poverty and Famines: An Essay on Entitlement and Deprivation (1981), a book in which he argued that famine occurs not only from a lack of food, but from inequalities built into mechanisms for distributing food. Sen also argued that the Bengal famine was caused by an urban economic boom that raised food prices, thereby causing millions of rural workers to starve to death when their wages did not keep up. In 1999 he wrote, "No famine has ever taken place ... in a functioning democracy".

In addition to his important work on the causes of famines, Sen's work in the field of development economics has had considerable influence on the formulation of the "Human Development Report", published by the United Nations Development Programme. This annual publication that ranks countries on a variety of economic and social indicators owes much to the contributions by Sen, among other social choice theorists, in the area of economic measurement of poverty and inequality.

=== "Equality of What?" (1979) ===
Sen's revolutionary contribution to development economics and social indicators is the concept of "capability" developed in his article "Equality of What?". He argues that governments should be measured against the concrete capabilities of their citizens. This is because top-down development will always trump human rights as long as the definition of terms remains in doubt (is a "right" something that must be provided or something that simply cannot be taken away?). For instance, in the United States, citizens have a right to vote. To Sen, this concept is fairly empty. For citizens to have a capacity to vote, they first must have "functionings". These "functionings" can range from the very broad, such as the availability of education, to the very specific, such as transportation to the polls. Only when such barriers are removed can the citizen truly be said to act out of personal choice. It is up to the individual society to make the list of minimum capabilities guaranteed by that society. For an example of the "capabilities approach" in practice, see Martha Nussbaum's Women and Human Development.

=== "More than 100 Million Women Are Missing" (1990) ===
He wrote a controversial article in The New York Review of Books entitled "More Than 100 Million Women Are Missing" (see Missing women of Asia), analysing the mortality impact of unequal rights between the genders in the developing world, particularly Asia. Other studies, including one by Emily Oster, had argued that this is an overestimation, though Oster has since then recanted her conclusions.

=== Development as Freedom (1999) ===
In 1999, Sen further advanced and redefined the capability approach in his book Development as Freedom. Sen argued that development should be viewed as an effort to advance the real freedoms that individuals enjoy, rather than simply focusing on metrics such as GDP or income-per-capita.

Sen was inspired by violent acts he had witnessed as a child leading up to the Partition of India in 1947. One morning, a Muslim daily labourer named Kader Mia stumbled through the rear gate of Sen's family home, bleeding from a knife wound in his back. Because of his extreme poverty, he had come to Sen's primarily Hindu neighbourhood searching for work; his choices were the starvation of his family or the risk of death in coming to the neighbourhood. The price of Kader Mia's economic unfreedom was his death. Kader Mia need not have come to a hostile area in search of income in those troubled times if his family could have managed without it. This experience led Sen to begin thinking about economic unfreedom from a young age.

In Development as Freedom, Sen outlined five specific types of freedoms: political freedoms, economic facilities, social opportunities, transparency guarantees, and protective security. Political freedoms refer to the ability of the people to have a voice in government and to be able to scrutinise the authorities. Economic facilities concern both the resources within the market and the market mechanism itself. Any focus on income and wealth in the country would serve to increase the economic facilities for the people. Social opportunities deal with the establishments that provide benefits like healthcare or education for the populace, allowing individuals to live better lives. Transparency guarantees allow individuals to interact with some degree of trust and knowledge of the interaction. Protective security is the system of social safety nets that prevents a group affected by poverty from being subjected to terrible misery. Development encompassing non-economic areas, Sen argues, renders the notion of a dichotomy between "freedom" and "development," as implied by the concept of Asian values, meaningless and disingenuous.

Before Sen's work, these had been viewed as only the ends of development; luxuries afforded to countries that focus on increasing income. However, Sen argued that the increase in real freedoms should be both the ends and the means of development. He elaborates upon this by illustrating the closely interconnected natures of the five main freedoms as he believes that expansion of one of those freedoms can lead to expansion in another one as well. In this regard, he discussed the correlation between social opportunities of education and health and how both of these complement economic and political freedoms as a healthy and well-educated person is better suited to make informed economic decisions and be involved in fruitful political demonstrations, etc. A comparison is also drawn between China and India to illustrate this interdependence of freedoms. Sen noted that both countries had been working towards developing their economies—China since 1979 and India since 1991.

=== The Idea of Justice (2009) ===
In 2009, Sen published a book titled The Idea of Justice. Based on his previous work in welfare economics and social choice theory, but also on his philosophical thoughts, Sen presented his own theory of justice that he meant to be an alternative to the influential modern theories of justice of John Rawls or John Harsanyi. In opposition to Rawls but also earlier justice theoreticians Immanuel Kant, Jean-Jacques Rousseau or David Hume, and inspired by the philosophical works of Adam Smith and Mary Wollstonecraft, Sen developed a theory that is both comparative and realisations-oriented (instead of being transcendental and institutional). However, he still regards institutions and processes as being equally important. As an alternative to Rawls's veil of ignorance, Sen chose the thought experiment of an impartial spectator as the basis of his theory of justice. He also stressed the importance of public discussion (understanding democracy in the sense of John Stuart Mill) and a focus on people's capabilities (an approach that he had co-developed), including the notion of universal human rights, in evaluating various states with regard to justice.

== Career ==
Sen began his career both as a teacher and a research scholar in the Department of Economics, Jadavpur University as a professor of economics in 1956. He spent two years in that position. From 1957 to 1963, Sen served as a fellow of Trinity College, Cambridge. Between 1960 and 1961, Sen was a visiting professor at Massachusetts Institute of Technology in the United States, where he got to know Paul Samuelson, Robert Solow, Franco Modigliani, and Norbert Wiener. He was also a visiting professor at the University of California, Berkeley (1964–1965) and Cornell University (1978–1984). He taught as Professor of Economics between 1963 and 1971 at the Delhi School of Economics (where he completed his magnum opus, Collective Choice and Social Welfare, in 1969).

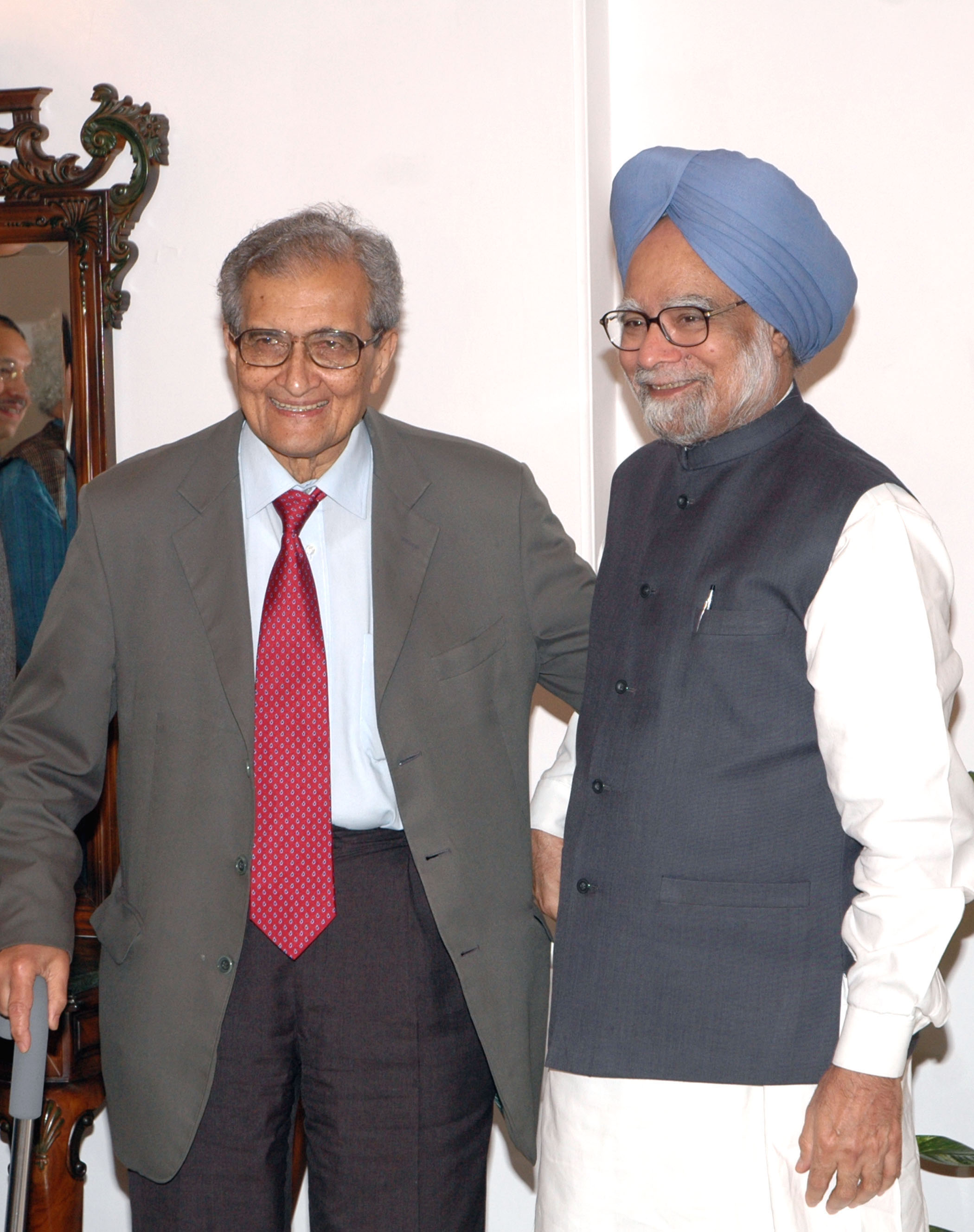
Sen with 13th Prime Minister of India Manmohan Singh

During this time Sen was also a frequent visitor to various other premiere Indian economic schools and centres of excellence, such as Jawaharlal Nehru University, the Indian Statistical Institute, the Centre for Development Studies, Gokhale Institute of Politics and Economics, and the Centre for Studies in Social Sciences. He was a companion of distinguished economists like Manmohan Singh (ex-Prime Minister of India and a veteran economist responsible for liberalising the Indian economy), K. N. Raj (advisor to various prime ministers and a veteran economist who was the founder of the Centre for Development Studies, Trivandrum, which is one of India's premier think tanks and schools), and Jagdish Bhagwati (who is known to be one of the greatest Indian economists in the field of international trade and currently teaches at Columbia University). This is a period considered to be a Golden Period in the history of the DSE. In 1971, he joined the London School of Economics as a professor of economics, and taught there until 1977. From 1977 to 1988, he taught at the University of Oxford, where he was first a professor of economics and fellow of Nuffield College, and then from 1980 the Drummond Professor of Political Economy and a fellow of All Souls College, Oxford.

In 1985, Sen co-founded the Eva Colorni Trust at the former London Guildhall University in memory of his deceased wife. In 1987, Sen joined Harvard as the Thomas W. Lamont University Professor of Economics. In 1998 he was appointed as Master of Trinity College, Cambridge, becoming the first Asian head of an Oxbridge college. In January 2004, Sen returned to Harvard.

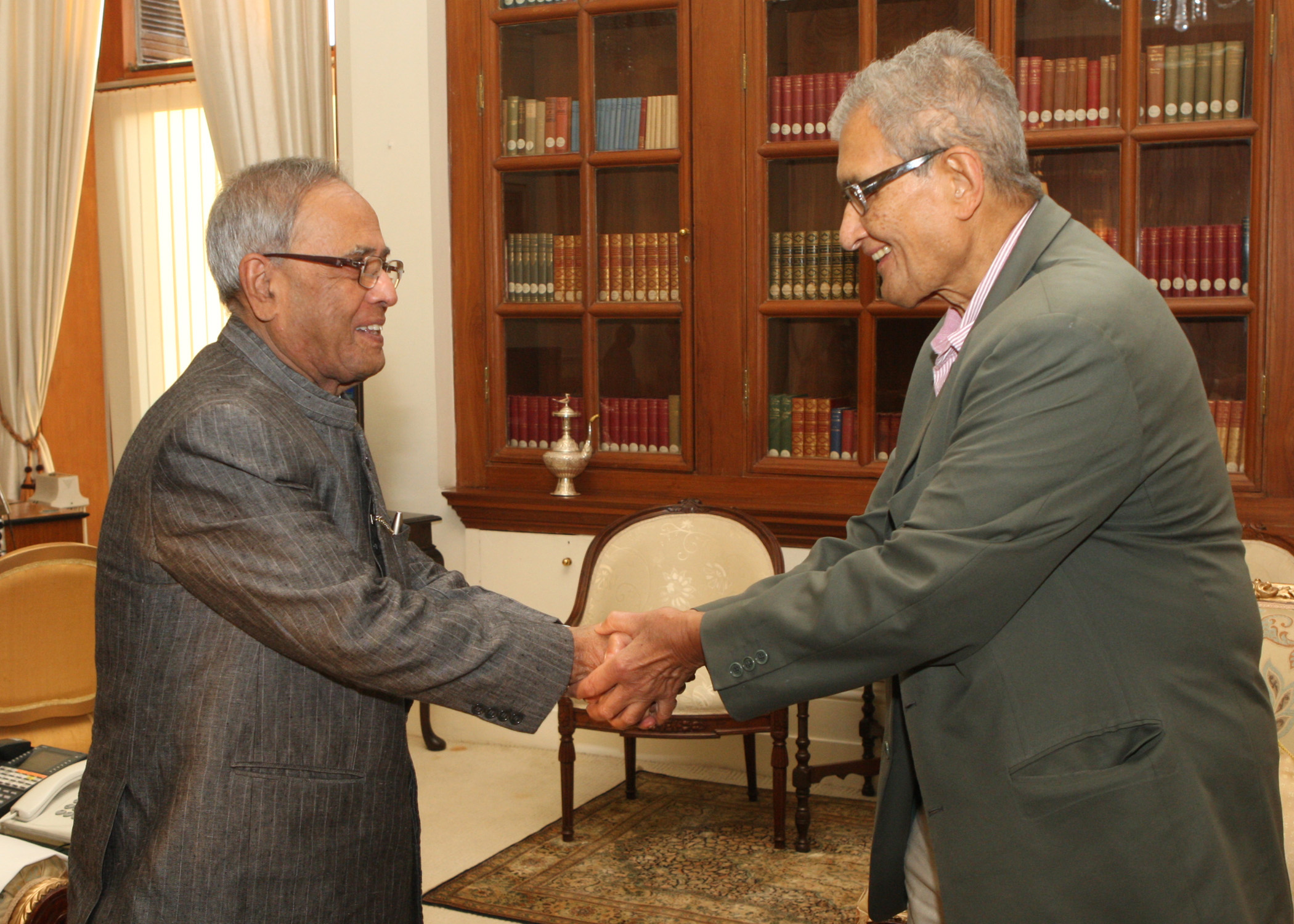
Sen with 13th President of India Pranab Mukherjee at Rashtrapati Bhavan in 2012

In May 2007, he was appointed chairman of Nalanda Mentor Group to plan the establishment of Nalanda University. The university was intended to be a revival of Nalanda mahavihara, an ancient educational centre.

He chaired the Social Sciences jury for the Infosys Prize from 2009 to 2011, and the Humanities jury from 2012 to 2018.

On 19 July 2012, Sen was named the first chancellor of the proposed Nalanda University (NU). Sen was criticised as the project suffered due to inordinate delays, mismanagement, and lack of presence of faculty on ground. Finally teaching began in August 2014. On 20 February 2015, Sen withdrew his candidature for a second term.

== Memberships and associations ==
He has served as president of the Econometric Society (1984), the International Economic Association (1986–1989), the Indian Economic Association (1989) and the American Economic Association (1994). He has also served as president of the Development Studies Association and the Human Development and Capability Association. He serves as the honorary director of the Academic Advisory Committee of the Center for Human and Economic Development Studies at Peking University in China.

Sen has been called "the Conscience of the profession" and "the Mother Teresa of Economics" for his work on famine, human development theory, welfare economics, the underlying mechanisms of poverty, gender inequality, and political liberalism. However, he denies the comparison to Mother Teresa, saying that he has never tried to follow a lifestyle of dedicated self-sacrifice. Amartya Sen also added his voice to the campaign against the anti-gay Section 377 of the Indian Penal Code.

Sen has served as Honorary Chairman of Oxfam, the UK based international development charity, and is now its Honorary Advisor.

Sen is also a member of the Berggruen Institute's 21st Century Council.

Sen is an Honorary Fellow of St Edmund's College, Cambridge.

He is also one of the 25 leading figures on the Information and Democracy Commission launched by Reporters Without Borders.

== Media and culture ==
A 56-minute documentary named Amartya Sen: A Life Re-examined directed by Suman Ghosh details his life and work. A documentary about Amartya Sen, titled The Argumentative Indian (the title of one of Sen's own books), was released in 2017.

A 2001 portrait of Sen by Annabel Cullen is in Trinity College's collection. A 2003 portrait of Sen hangs in the National Portrait Gallery in London.

In 2011, he was present at the Rabindra Utsab ceremony at Bangabandhu International Conference Centre (BICC), Bangladesh. He unveiled the cover of Sruti Gitobitan, a Rabindrasangeet album comprising all the 2222 Tagore songs, brought out by Rezwana Chowdhury Bannya, principal of Shurer Dhara School of Music.

Max Roser said that it was the work of Sen that made him create Our World in Data.

== Political views ==
Sen was critical of Narendra Modi when he was announced as the prime ministerial candidate for the BJP. In April 2014, he said that Modi would not make a good prime minister. He conceded later in December 2014 that Modi did give people a sense of faith that things can happen. In February 2015, Sen opted out of seeking a second term for the chancellor post of Nalanda University, stating that the Government of India was not keen on him continuing in the post due to their displeasure with his tenure. In 2017, Sen called for the revival of the classical liberal Swatantra party in response to BJP's "majoritarian ideology and practice."

There is an important role for a clear-headed, pro-market, pro-business party that does not depend on religious politics, and does not prioritise one religious community over all others...the Swatantra Party for example...but the party died. I wish it would be revived

— Amartya Sen, Jaipur Literature Festival 2017

In August 2019, during the clampdown and curfew in Kashmir for more than two weeks after the Indian revocation of Jammu and Kashmir's special status, Sen criticised the government and said "As an Indian, I am not proud of the fact that India, after having done so much to achieve a democratic norm in the world – where India was the first non-Western country to go for democracy – that we lose that reputation on the grounds of action that have been taken". He regarded the detention of Kashmiri political leaders as "a classical colonial excuse" to prevent backlash against the Indian government's decision and called for a democratic solution that would involve Kashmiri people.

Sen has spent much of his later life as a political writer and activist. He has been outspoken about Narendra Modi's leadership in India. In an interview with The New York Times, he claimed that Modi's fearmongering among the Indian people was anti-democratic. "The big thing that we know from John Stuart Mill is that democracy is government by discussion, and, if you make discussion fearful, you are not going to get a democracy, no matter how you count the votes." He disagreed with Modi's ideology of Hindu nationalism, and advocated for a more integrated and diverse ideology that reflects the heterogeneity of India.

Sen also wrote an article for The New York Times in 2013 documenting the reasons why India trailed behind China in economic development. He advocated for healthcare reform, because low-income people in India have to deal with exploitative and inadequate private healthcare. He recommended that India implement the same education policies that Japan did in the late 19th century. However, he conceded that there is a tradeoff between democracy and progress in Asia because democracy is a near reality in India and not in China.

In a 1999 article in The Atlantic, Sen recommended for India a middle path between the "hard-knocks" development policy that creates wealth at the expense of civil liberties, and radical progressivism that only seeks to protect civil liberties at the expense of development. Rather than create an entirely new theory for ethical development in Asia, Sen sought to reform the current development model.

In 2025, Sen raised concerns about the Special Intensive Revision (SIR) of electoral rolls in Bihar, warning that it could disenfranchise poor and marginalized people if documentation requirements are too strict.

Sen has also been a constant critic of the construction of Ram Mandir, having the stance that the construction of a Hindu temple is against the idea of secularism.

Though never a communist, Sen has spoken highly of Marxism while adopting a critical stance regarding the lack of freedom of thought that Marxist orthodoxy denounces and similarly lauded Adam Smith's criticism of slavery, racism and other obstacles to participation in the free market.

== Personal life and beliefs ==
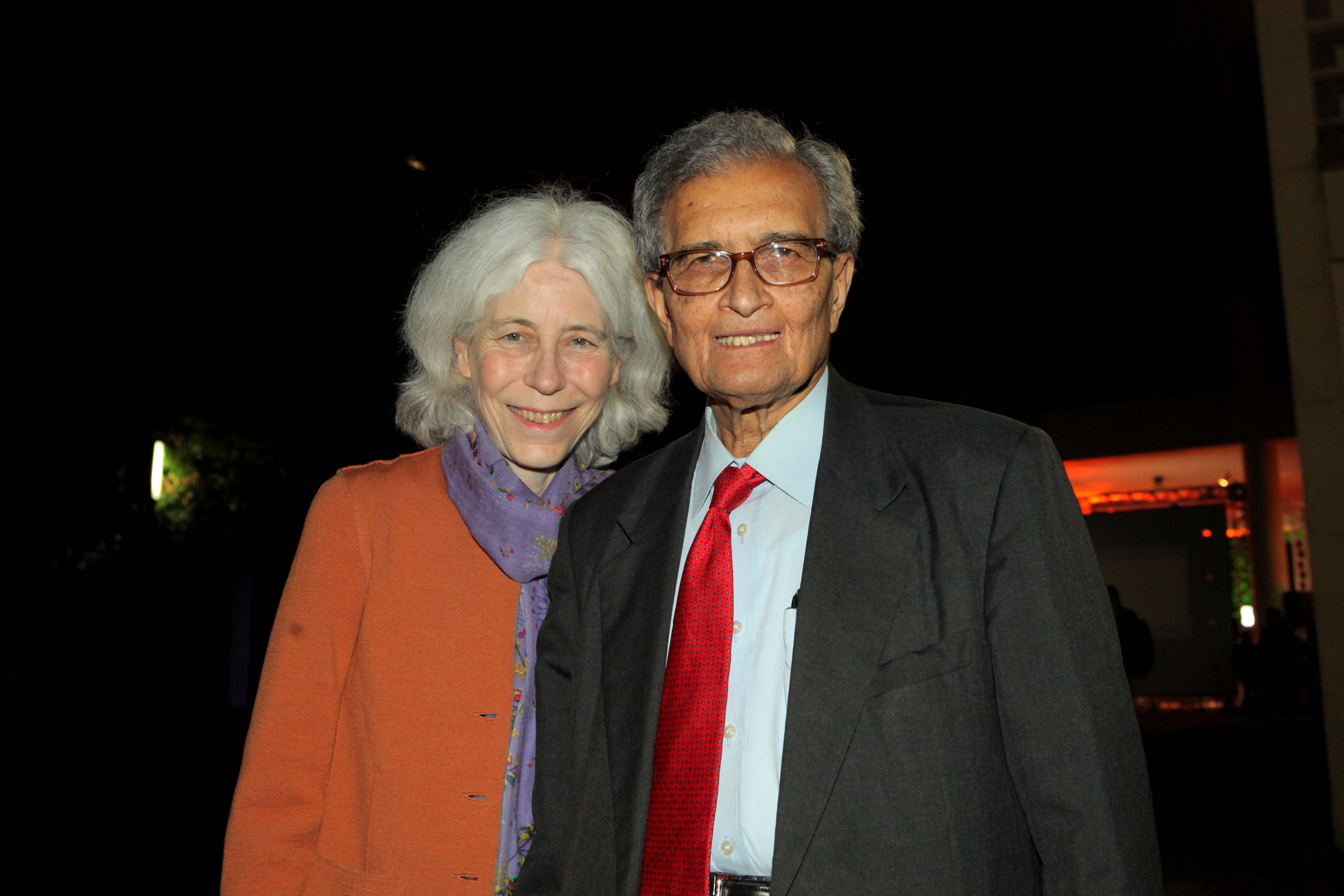
Sen with his wife Emma Rothschild.

Sen has been married three times. His first wife was Nabaneeta Dev Sen, an Indian writer and scholar, with whom he had two daughters: Antara, a journalist and publisher, and Nandana, a Bollywood actress. Their marriage broke up shortly after they moved to London in 1971. In 1978 Sen married Eva Colorni, an Italian economist, daughter of Eugenio Colorni and Ursula Hirschmann and niece of Albert O. Hirschman. The couple had two children, a daughter Indrani, who is a journalist in New York, and a son Kabir, a hip hop artist, MC, and music teacher at Shady Hill School. Eva died of cancer in 1985. In 1991, Sen married Emma Georgina Rothschild, who serves as the Jeremy and Jane Knowles Professor of History at Harvard University.

The Sens have a house in Cambridge, Massachusetts, which is the base from which they teach during the academic year. They also have a home in Cambridge, England, where Sen is a Fellow of Trinity College, Cambridge, and Rothschild is a Fellow of Magdalene College. He usually spends his winter holidays at his home in Shantiniketan in West Bengal, India, where he used to go on long bike rides until recently. Asked how he relaxes, he replies: "I read a lot and like arguing with people."

Sen is an atheist. In an interview, he noted:

In some ways people had got used to the idea that India was spiritual and religion-oriented. That gave a leg up to the religious interpretation of India, despite the fact that Sanskrit had a larger atheistic literature than exists in any other classical language. Madhava Acharya, the remarkable 14th century philosopher, wrote this rather great book called Sarvadarshansamgraha, which discussed all the religious schools of thought within the Hindu structure. The first chapter is "Atheism"—a very strong presentation of the argument in favor of atheism and materialism.

== Awards and honours ==
Sen has received over 90 honorary degrees from universities around the world. In 2019, London School of Economics announced the creation of the Amartya Sen Chair in Inequality Studies.

- Adam Smith Prize, 1954
- Foreign Honorary Member of the American Academy of Arts and Sciences, 1981
- Honorary fellowship by the Institute of Social Studies, 1984
- Resident member of the American Philosophical Society, 1997
- Nobel Memorial Prize in Economic Sciences, 1998
- Bharat Ratna, the highest civilian award in India, 1999
- Honorary citizenship of Bangladesh, 1999
- Honorary Member of the Order of the Companions of Honour, UK, 2000
- Leontief Prize, 2000
- Eisenhower Medal for Leadership and Service, 2000
- 351st Commencement Speaker of Harvard University, 2001
- International Humanist Award from the International Humanist and Ethical Union, 2002
- Lifetime Achievement Award by the Indian Chamber of Commerce, 2004
- Life Time Achievement award by Bangkok-based United Nations Economic and Social Commission for Asia and the Pacific (UNESCAP)
- Time 100, 2010
- National Humanities Medal, 2011
- Order of the Aztec Eagle, 2012
- Chevalier of the French Legion of Honour, 2013
- 25 Greatest Global Living Legends in India by NDTV, 2013
- Top 100 thinkers who have defined our century by The New Republic, 2014
- Charleston-EFG John Maynard Keynes Prize, 2015
- Albert O. Hirschman Prize, Social Science Research Council, 2016
- Johan Skytte Prize in Political Science, 2017
- Bodley Medal, 2019
- Friedenspreis des Deutschen Buchhandels, 2020
- Princess of Asturias Award, 2021
- Gold Medal from The National Institute of Social Sciences, 2021
- International Rescue Committee Freedom Award, 2023

== Bibliography ==
=== Books ===
- Sen, Amartya (1960). Choice of Techniques: An Aspect of the Theory of Planned Economic Development. Oxford: Basil Blackwell.

An expanded third edition was published by Basil Blackwell in 1968.

- Sen, Amartya (1970). Collective Choice and Social Welfare (1st ed.). San Francisco, California: Holden-Day. ISBN 9780816277650.

An expanded edition was published by Harvard University Press in 2017.

- Sen, Amartya (1973). On Economic Inequality. Oxford New York: Clarendon Press Oxford University Press. ISBN 9780198281825.

An expanded edition with a substantial annexe by James E. Foster and Amartya Sen was published by Clarendon Press in 1997.

- Sen, Amartya (1975). Employment, Technology and Development: A Study Prepared for the International Labour Office within the Framework of the World Employment Programme. Oxford: Clarendon Press. ISBN 9780198770534.
- Sen, Amartya (1982). Poverty and Famines: An Essay on Entitlement and Deprivation. Oxford New York: Clarendon Press Oxford University Press. ISBN 9780198284635.
- Sen, Amartya; Williams, Bernard (1982). Utilitarianism and beyond. Cambridge: Cambridge University Press. ISBN 9780511611964.
- Sen, Amartya (1983). Choice, Welfare, and Measurement. Oxford: Basil Blackwell. ISBN 9780631137962.

Reissued in paperback format by Harvard University Press in 1997.
Reviewed in the Social Scientist: Sanyal, Amal (October 1983). "'Choice, welfare and measurement' by Amartya Sen". Social Scientist. 11 (10): 49–56. doi:10.2307/3517043. JSTOR 3517043.

- Sen, Amartya (1984). Resources, Values, and Development. Oxford: Basil Blackwell. ISBN 9780631133421.

Reissued in paperback format by Harvard University Press in 1997.

- Sen, Amartya (1985). Commodities and Capabilities (1st ed.). New York: North-Holland Sole distributors for the U.S. and Canada, Elsevier Science Publishing Co. ISBN 9780444877307.

Reviewed in The Economic Journal.

- Sen, Amartya; Hawthorn, Geoffrey (1987). The Standard of Living. Cambridge: Cambridge University Press. ISBN 9780521321013.
- Sen, Amartya (1987). On Ethics and Economics. New York: Basil Blackwell. ISBN 9780631164012.
- Sen, Amartya; Drèze, Jean (1989). Hunger and Public Action. Oxford England New York: Clarendon Press Oxford University Press. ISBN 9780198286349.
- Sen, Amartya (1992). Inequality Reexamined. Harvard University Press. ISBN 0674452550.
- Sen, Amartya; Nussbaum, Martha (1993). The Quality of Life. Oxford England New York: Clarendon Press Oxford University Press. ISBN 9780198287971.
- Sen, Amartya; Drèze, Jean (1998). India: Economic Development and Social Opportunity. Oxford England New York: Clarendon Press Oxford University Press. ISBN 9780198295280.

A revised and expanded edition, retitled India: Development and Participation, was published by Oxford University Press in 2002.

- Sen, Amartya; Suzumura, Kōtarō; Arrow, Kenneth J. (1996). Social Choice Re-examined: Proceedings of the IEA conference held at Schloss Hernstein, Berndorf, near Vienna, Austria. Vol. 2 (1st ed.). New York: St. Martin's Press. ISBN 9780312127398.
- Sen, Amartya (1999). Development as Freedom. New York: Oxford University Press. ISBN 9780198297581.

Review in Asia Times.

- Sen, Amartya (2002). Rationality and Freedom. Cambridge, MA: Belknap Press. ISBN 9780674013513.
- Sen, Amartya; Suzumura, Kōtarō; Arrow, Kenneth J. (2002). Handbook of social choice and welfare. Amsterdam Boston: Elsevier. ISBN 9780444829146.
- Sen, Amartya (2005). The Argumentative Indian: Writings on Indian History, Culture, and Identity. New York: Farrar, Straus and Giroux. ISBN 9780312426026.

Review The Guardian.
Review The Washington Post.

- Sen, Amartya (2006). Identity and Violence: The Illusion of Destiny. Issues of our time. New York: W.W. Norton & Co. ISBN 9780393329292.
- Sen, Amartya (31 December 2007). "Imperial Illusions". The New Republic.
- Sen, Amartya; Zamagni, Stefano; Scazzieri, Roberto (2008). Markets, money and capital: Hicksian economics for the twenty-first century. Cambridge, UK New York: Cambridge University Press. ISBN 9780521873215.
- Sen, Amartya (2010). The Idea of Justice. London: Penguin. ISBN 9780141037851.
- Sen, Amartya; Stiglitz, Joseph E.; Fitoussi, Jean-Paul (2010). Mismeasuring our lives: why GDP doesn't add up: the report. New York: New Press Distributed by Perseus Distribution. ISBN 9781595585196.
- Sen, Amartya (2011). Peace and Democratic Society. Cambridge, UK: Open Book Publishers. ISBN 9781906924393.
- Drèze, Jean; Sen, Amartya (2013). An Uncertain Glory: The Contradictions of Modern India. London: Allen Lane. ISBN 9781846147616.
- Sen, Amartya (2015). The Country of First Boys: And Other Essays. India: Oxford University Press. ISBN 9780198738183.
- Sen, Amartya (2020). Home in the World: A Memoir. London: Penguin. ISBN 9780141970981.

=== Chapters in books ===
- Sen, Amartya (1980), "Equality of what? (lecture delivered at Stanford University, 22 May 1979)", in MacMurrin, Sterling M. (ed.), The Tanner lectures on human values, vol. 1 (1st ed.), Salt Lake City, Utah: University of Utah Press, ISBN 9780874801781.
- Sen, Amartya (1988), "The concept of development", in Srinivasan, T.N.; Chenery, Hollis (eds.), Handbook of development economics, vol. 1, Amsterdam New York New York, N.Y.: North-Holland Sole distributors for the U.S. and Canada, Elsevier Science Publishing Co., pp. 2–23, ISBN 9780444703378.
- Sen, Amartya (2004), "Capability and well-being", in Nussbaum, Martha; Sen, Amartya (eds.), The quality of life, New York: Routledge, pp. 30–53, ISBN 9780415934411.
- Sen, Amartya (2004), "Development as capability expansion", in Kumar, A. K. Shiva; Fukuda-Parr, Sakiko (eds.), Readings in human development: concepts, measures and policies for a development paradigm, New Delhi New York: Oxford University Press, ISBN 9780195670523.

Reprinted in Sen, Amartya (2012), "Development as capability expansion", in Saegert, Susan; DeFilippis, James (eds.), The community development reader, New York: Routledge, ISBN 9780415507769.

- Sen, Amartya (2008), ""Justice" – definition", in Durlauf, Steven N.; Blume, Lawrence E. (eds.), The new Palgrave dictionary of economics (8 volume set) (2nd ed.), Basingstoke, Hampshire New York: Palgrave Macmillan, ISBN 9780333786765. See also: The New Palgrave Dictionary of Economics.
- Sen, Amartya (2008), ""Social choice"—definition", in Durlauf, Steven N.; Blume, Lawrence E. (eds.), The new Palgrave dictionary of economics (8 volume set) (2nd ed.), Basingstoke, Hampshire; New York: Palgrave Macmillan, ISBN 9780333786765. See also: The New Palgrave Dictionary of Economics.

=== Journal articles ===
- Sen, Amartya (1962). "An aspect of Indian agriculture" (PDF). Economic and Political Weekly. 14: 243–246.
- Sen, Amartya (January–February 1970). "The impossibility of a paretian liberal" (PDF). Journal of Political Economy. 78 (1): 152–157. Bibcode:1970JPoEc..78..152S. doi:10.1086/259614. JSTOR 1829633. S2CID 154193982. Archived from the original (PDF) on 1 November 2013.
- Sen, Amartya (March 1976). "Poverty: An ordinal approach to measurement" (PDF). Econometrica. 44 (2): 219–231. doi:10.2307/1912718. JSTOR 1912718.
- Sen, Amartya (September 1979). "Utilitarianism and welfarism". The Journal of Philosophy. 76 (9): 463–489. doi:10.2307/2025934. JSTOR 2025934.
- Sen, Amartya (1986). "Chapter 22 Social choice theory". Handbook of Mathematical Economics. Vol. 3. pp. 1073–1181. doi:10.1016/S1573-4382(86)03004-7. ISBN 9780444861283.
- Sen, Amartya (20 December 1990). "More than 100 million women are missing". The New York Review of Books. 37 (20).
- Sen, Amartya (7 March 1992). "Missing women: social inequality outweighs women's survival advantage in Asia and North Africa" (PDF). British Medical Journal. 304 (6827): 587–588. doi:10.1136/bmj.304.6827.587. PMC 1881324. PMID 1559085.
- Sen, Amartya (May 2005). "The three R's of reform". Economic and Political Weekly. 40 (19): 1971–1974. Archived from the original on 27 July 2014.

=== Lecture transcripts ===
- Sen, Amartya (25 May 1997), Human Rights and Asian Values Archived 14 April 2021 at the Wayback Machine, Sixteenth Annual Morgenthau Memorial Lecture on Ethics and Foreign Policy
- Sen, Amartya Kumar (8 December 1998), The possibility of social choice, Trinity College, Cambridge, UK (Nobel lecture) (PDF), Wikidata Q123753560
- Sen, Amartya (1999), Reason before identity, Oxford New York: Oxford University Press, ISBN 9780199513895.

News coverage of the 1998 Romanes Lecture in the Oxford University Gazette.

=== Papers ===
- Sen, Amartya (February 1986), Food, economics and entitlements (wider working paper 1), vol. 1986/01, Helsinki: UNU-WIDER.

=== Selected works in Persian ===
A list of Persian translations of Amartya Sen's work is available here Archived 20 December 2016 at the Wayback Machine

== See also ==
- Abhijit Banerjee
- Equality of autonomy, a concept of equality posed by Sen
- Feminist economics
- Human Development Index
- List of feminist economists
- Kerala model, an expression or concept observed and introduced by Sen
- Instrumental and value rationality, describing some of his differences with John Rawls, Robert Nozick, and James Gouinlock.

Academic offices
Preceded by Sir Michael Atiyah	36th Master of Trinity College, University of Cambridge; 1998–2004	Succeeded by Sir Martin Rees
Preceded by Michael Savage	Director of International Inequalities Institute, London School of Economics; 2019 to incumbent	Succeeded by
Non-profit organization positions
Preceded by Herbert Scarf	President of the Econometric Society; 1984–1985	Succeeded by Daniel McFadden
Preceded by Kenneth Arrow	President of the International Economic Association; 1986–1989	Succeeded by Anthony B. Atkinson
Preceded by Zvi Griliches	President of the American Economic Association; 1994–1995	Succeeded by Victor R. Fuchs
New creation	President of the Human Development and Capability Association; September 2004 – September 2006	Succeeded by Martha Nussbaum
Awards
Preceded by Robert C. Merton / Myron S. Scholes	Laureates of the Nobel Memorial Prize in Economic Sciences; 1998	Succeeded by Robert A. Mundell
Preceded by M. S. Subbulakshmi / Chidambaram Subramaniam	Recipient of the Bharat Ratna; 1999; Served alongside: Jayaprakash Narayan, Gopinath Bordoloi, Ravi Shankar	Succeeded by Lata Mangeshkar / Bismillah Khan
