= Eva Colorni =

Italian economist (1941–1985)

Eva Colorni (1941–1985) was an Italian economist.

== Early life ==
Eva Colorni was born in Italy in 1941 to anti-fascist activists Eugenio Colorni and Ursula Hirschmann. Her father was a socialist philosopher, while her mother was a German-born economist that had fled Nazi Germany. Her father was killed by fascists during World War II. Her mother remarried Altiero Spinelli, who became Colorni's stepfather.

== Education and career ==
Colorni attended the University of Pavia and then began teaching. She moved to India where she taught at the Delhi School of Economics. She then moved to England.

== Personal life ==
Colorni began dating Amartya Sen, with whom she moved to North London in 1973. They married in 1978 and had two children together. After being diagnosed with cancer, she continued to teach for nearly two additional terms. She died of stomach cancer in 1985.

Colorni helped guide Sen's work, directing his attention to "practical issues of importance". She is also credited as an influence on her uncle, Albert O. Hirschman.
