= Eugenio Colorni =

Italian philosopher and anti-fascist activist (1909–1944)

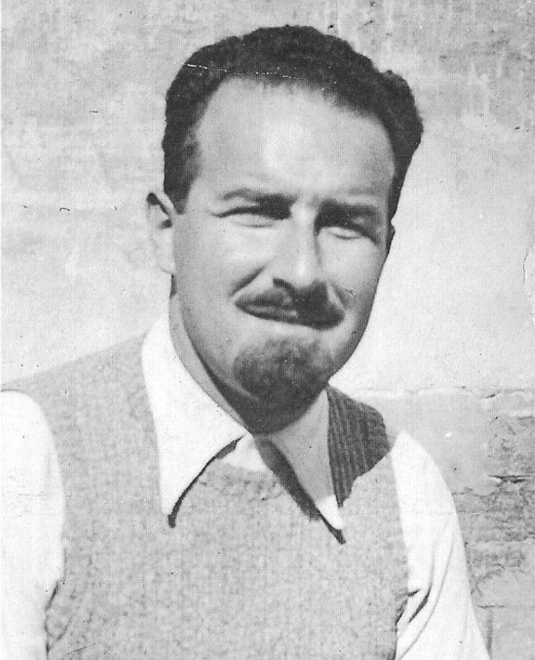

Eugenio Colorni (22 April 1909 – 28 May 1944) was an Italian philosopher and anti-fascist activist.

== Life ==
Born in Milan on 22 April 1909, Colorni taught philosophy at the University of Trieste, and was active in the anti-fascist Giustizia e Libertà movement. Colorni was one of the promoters of the Ventotene Manifesto and an early instigator of the European Federalist Movement. In the mid-1930s, he was closely associated with Lelio Basso and others. On 9 September 1938 he and Dino Philipson were arrested in Trieste for their anti-fascist political activity and their Jewish background. He was imprisoned in the Ventotene prison, then transferred to Melfi. He escaped to Rome in the spring of 1943, where he edited and released the Ventotene Manifesto through the socialist underground newspaper Avanti!, but he was killed in Rome by a Nazi ambush on the Piazza Bologna on 28 May 1944, one week before the Allies arrived.

He married Ursula Hirschmann in 1935, and was an important influence on her brother Albert O. Hirschman, who dedicated his book Exit, Voice, and Loyalty to Colorni's memory. He had three daughters by Ursula: Silvia, Renata, and Eva. His youngest daughter Eva married Indian economist Amartya Sen in 1978 and produced two children prior to her death seven years later.

== Works ==
- L'estetica di Benedetto Croce: studio critico, 1932
- (ed.) Leibniz, La Monadologia, 1935
- Leibniz e il misticismo, 1938
- 'Filosofia e scienza', Analysis, 1947
- 'Apologo', Sigma, 1947
- 'I'dialoghi di Commodo', Sigma, 1949
- 'Critica filosofia e fisica teoria', Sigma, 1948
- Scritt, Florence: La Nuova Italia, 1975

== Sources ==
- Adelman, Jeremy (2013). Worldly Philosopher: The Odyssey of Albert O. Hirschman. Princeton, NJ: Princeton University Press. ISBN 978-0691155678. OCLC 820123478.
- Elvira Gencarelli, Profilo politico di Eugenio Colorni, in «Mondo Operaio», n. 7, luglio 1974, pp. 49–54
- Elvira Gencarelli, Eugenio Colorni, article in Il Movimento Operaio Italiano. Dizionario Biografico, Editori Riuniti, Roma, 1976, vol. II, pp. 74–81
- Leo Solari, Eugenio Colorni. Ieri e sempre, Marsilio, Venezia, 1980
- Eugenio Garin, Colorni, Eugenio, in «Dizionario Biografico degli Italiani», XXVII, Istituto dell'Enciclopedia italiana, Roma, 1982
- Norberto Bobbio, Maestri e compagni, Passigli Editori, Firenze, 1984
- Nunzio Dell'Erba, L'itinerario politico di Eugenio Colorni, in Id., Il socialismo riformista tra politica e cultura, Franco Angeli, Milano 1990, pp. 135–150
- Massimo Orlandi, Il socialismo federalista di Eugenio Colorni, unpublished thesis, Università degli studi di Firenze, Anno Accademico 1991–1992
- Gaetano Arfé, Eugenio Colorni, l'antifascista, l'europeista, in AA. VV., Matteotti, Buozzi, Colorni. Perché vissero, perché vivono, Franco Angeli, Milano, 1996, pp. 58–77
- Sandro Gerbi, Tempi di malafede. Una storia italiana tra fascismo e dopoguerra. Guido Piovene ed Eugenio Colorni, Einaudi, Torino 1999 e Hoepli, Milano, 2012.
- Geri Cerchiai, L'itinerario filosofico di Eugenio Colorni, in «Rivista di Storia della Filosofia», n. 3, 2002
- Stefano Miccolis, Eugenio Colorni ventenne e Croce, in «Belfagor», 4, LXV, 31 luglio 2010, pp. 415–434
- Geri Cerchiai, Alcune riflessioni su Eugenio Colorni, in «Rivista di Storia della Filosofia», LXVII 2012, pp. 351–360.
- Michele Strazza, Melfi terra di confino. Il confino a Melfi durante il fascismo, Melfi, Tarsia, 2002.
- Maurizio Degl'Innocenti (a cura di), Eugenio Colorni dall'antifascismo all'europeismo socialista e federalista, Lacaita, 2010, ISBN 9788889506899.
