= Ventotene Manifesto =

European federalism manifesto

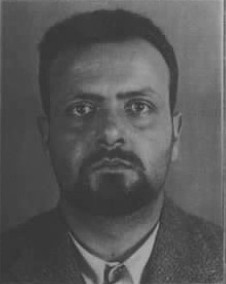
Spinelli when a prisoner in Ventotene, 1930s

The Ventotene Manifesto (Italian: Manifesto di Ventotene), officially entitled For a Free and United Europe. A Draft Manifesto (Per un'Europa libera e unita. Progetto d'un manifesto), is a political statement written by Altiero Spinelli, Ernesto Rossi, and Eugenio Colorni, while they were imprisoned on the Italian islet Santo Stefano off the island of Ventotene during World War II. Completed in June 1941, the manifesto was circulated within the Italian Resistance, and it soon became the programme of the Movimento Federalista Europeo. It called for a socialist federation of Europe and the world. In the text, European federalism and world federalism are presented as a way to prevent future wars. Vayssière notes that the manifesto is widely seen as the birth of European federalism. Spinelli, who was later elected to the European Parliament within the Italian Communist Party lists, became a leader of the federalist movement due to his primary authorship of the Manifesto and his postwar advocacy. The manifesto called for a break with Europe's past to form a new political system through a restructuring of politics and extensive social reform. It was presented not as an ideal, but as the best option for Europe's postwar condition.

== Key text ==
The Ventotene Manifesto's key proposal was a federated European republic. Once this was established, it would wait for the possibility of world federalism.

The Manifesto criticised the "capitalist imperialism which our own generation has seen expand to the point of forming totalitarian states and to the unleashing of world wars". It took aim at the League of Nations which was described as useless and "even harmful". The League had no military force and therefore could not impose its decisions.

The most important assessment was the assertion that

"The dividing line between progressive and reactionary parties no longer follows the formal line of greater or lesser democracy, or of more or less socialism to be instituted; rather the division falls along the line, very new and substantial, that separates the party members into two groups. The first is made up of those who conceive the essential purpose and goal of struggle as the ancient one, that is, the conquest of national political power – and who, although involuntarily, play into the hands of reactionary forces, letting the incandescent lava of popular passions set in the old moulds, and thus allowing old absurdities to arise once again. The second are those who see the creation of a solid international State as the main purpose; they will direct popular forces toward this goal, and, having won national power, will use it first and foremost as an instrument for achieving international unity."

=== Socialism and communism ===
The document declared that "the European revolution must be socialist, that is it must have as its goal the emancipation of the working classes and the realization for them of more humane living conditions". However, it opposed "doctrinaire" formulations of transitions to socialism and said "private property must be abolished, limited, corrected, extended: instance by instance, however, not dogmatically according to principle".

It commended communists for being the most efficiently organised of political groupings, but said they had flaws in that they had a "dependence upon the Russian State" and possessed a sectarian nature which prevented them from working with others, which can weaken "the sum of the progressive forces". A movement should criticise "old, political statements" while knowing how to collaborate with other groups without becoming "ensnared by the political practices of any of these".

== Editions ==
- Il Manifesto di Ventotene / The Ventotene Manifesto, Altiero Spinelli and Ernesto Rossi, preface by Eugenio Colorni. Foreword by Laura Boldrini, introductions by Lucio Levi and Pier Virgilio Dastoli. Editrice Ultima spiaggia, book series "Sand Grains" by Nicola Vallinoto, July 2016. [Bilingual edition Italian and English]

== See also ==
- Toward European Unity
