= Ernesto Rossi (politician) =

Italian politician, journalist, and anti-fascist activist (1897–1967)

Ernesto Rossi (25 August 1897 – 9 February 1967) was an Italian politician, journalist, and anti-fascist activist. His ideas contributed to the Action Party, and subsequently the Radical Party. He was co-author of the Ventotene Manifesto. Born in Caserta, the not yet nineteen-years old Rossi voluntarily enlisted and fought in World War I. After the war, moved by opposition to the socialists' attitude of hostility towards war veterans and their sacrifices and by contempt of the incapable political class of bounding idealists, he approached the nationalists of Il Popolo d'Italia (directed by Benito Mussolini), a newspaper with which he collaborated from 1919 to 1922. During that time, Rossi met Gaetano Salvemini, a democratic left-interventionist with whom he formed a long-lasting bond of respect and friendship, and he moved definitively and radically further from the positions that were bringing him to the Italian fascist ideology. Aged 69, he died in Rome in 1967.

== Bibliography ==
- Fiori, Giuseppe (1997). Ernesto Rossi. Milan: Garzanti. ISBN 978-8-8061-4536-1.
