= Equality of outcome =

Political concept

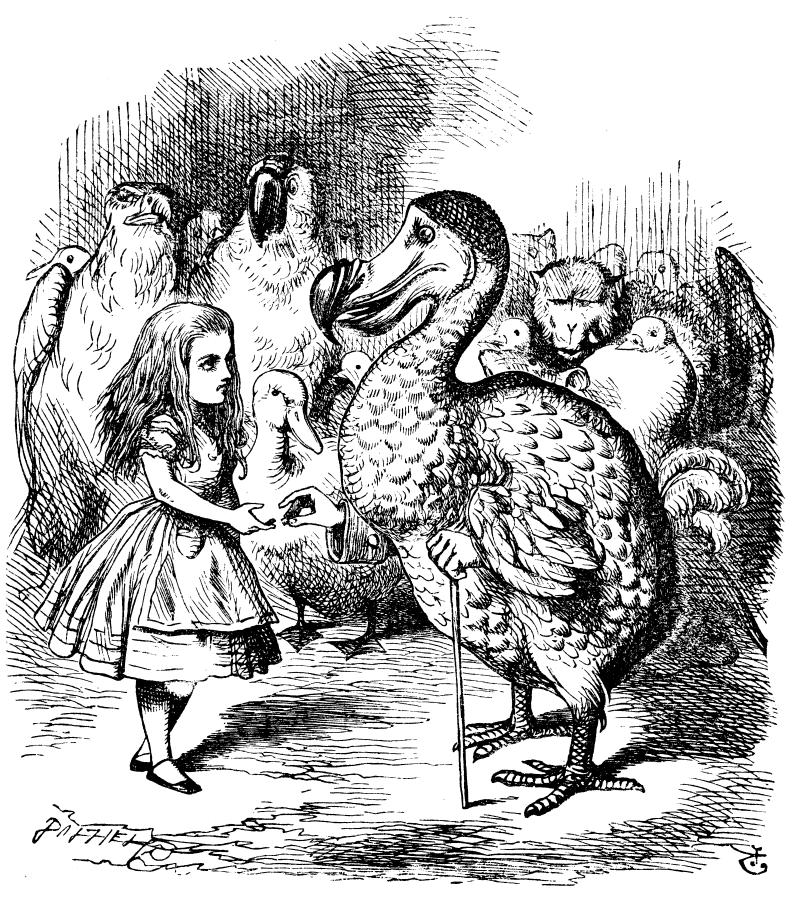
In the novel Alice's Adventures in Wonderland, the Dodo tells Alice that "everybody has won and all must have prizes". One analyst suggested that this quote describes the controversial concept of equality of outcome.

Equality of outcome, equality of condition, or equality of results is a political concept which is central to some political ideologies and is used in some political discourse, often in contrast to the term equality of opportunity. It describes a state in which all people have approximately the same material wealth and income, or in which the general economic conditions of everyone's lives are alike.

Achieving equal results generally entails reducing or eliminating material inequalities between individuals or households in society and usually involves a transfer of income or wealth from wealthier to poorer individuals, or adopting other measures to promote equality of condition.

One account in The Journal of Political Philosophy suggested that the term meant "equalising where people end up rather than where or how they begin", but described this sense of the term as "simplistic" since it failed to identify what was supposed to be made equal.

== In politics ==
=== Political philosophy ===
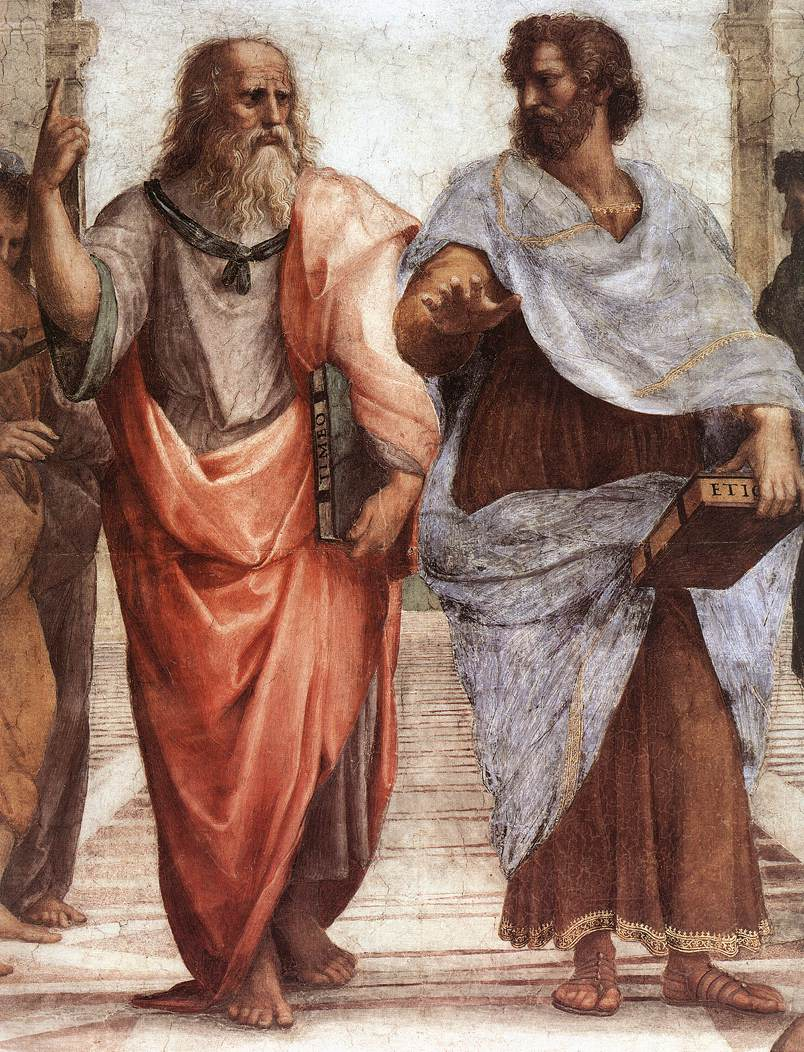
The ancient Greek philosophers Plato and Aristotle debated economic equality. Painting by Raffaello Sanzio (1509)

According to professor of politics Ed Rooksby, the concept of equality of outcome is an important one in disputes between different political positions, since equality has overall been seen as positive and an important concept that is "deeply embedded in the fabric of modern politics". Conflict between so-called haves and have-nots has happened throughout human civilization and was a focus of philosophers such as Aristotle in his treatise Politics. In political philosophy, there are differing views on whether equal outcomes are beneficial or not. One view is that there is a moral basis for equality of outcome, but that the means of achieving such an outcome can be malevolent.

Writing in the journal Foreign Affairs, analyst George Packer argued that "inequality undermines democracy" in the United States partially because it "hardens society into a class system, imprisoning people in the circumstances of their birth". Packer elaborated that inequality "corrodes trust among fellow citizens" and compared it to an "odorless gas which pervades every corner" of the nation.

In his 1987 book The Passion for Equality, analyst Kenneth Cauthen suggested that there were moral underpinnings for having equal outcomes because there is a common good—which people both contribute to and receive benefits from—and therefore should be enjoyed in common. Cauthen argued that this was a fundamental basis for both equality of opportunity as well as equality of outcome.

One view is that mechanisms to achieve equal outcomes—to take a society and with unequal socioeconomic levels and force it to equal outcomes—are fraught with moral as well as practical problems since they often involve political coercion to compel the transfer.

According to one report in Britain, outcomes matter because unequal outcomes in terms of personal wealth had a strong impact on average life expectancy, such that wealthier people tended to live seven years longer than poorer people and that egalitarian nations tended to have fewer problems with societal issues such as mental illness, violence, teenage pregnancy and other social problems. Authors of the book The Spirit Level contended that "more equal societies almost always do better" on other measures and as a result striving for equal outcomes can have overall beneficial effects for everybody.

In his A Theory of Justice (1971), philosopher John Rawls developed a "second principle of justice" that economic and social inequalities can only be justified if they benefit the most disadvantaged members of society. Rawls further claims that all economically and socially privileged positions must be open to all people equally. Rawls argues that the inequality between a doctor's salary and a grocery clerk's is only acceptable if this is the only way to encourage the training of sufficient numbers of doctors, preventing an unacceptable decline in the availability of medical care (which would therefore disadvantage everyone).

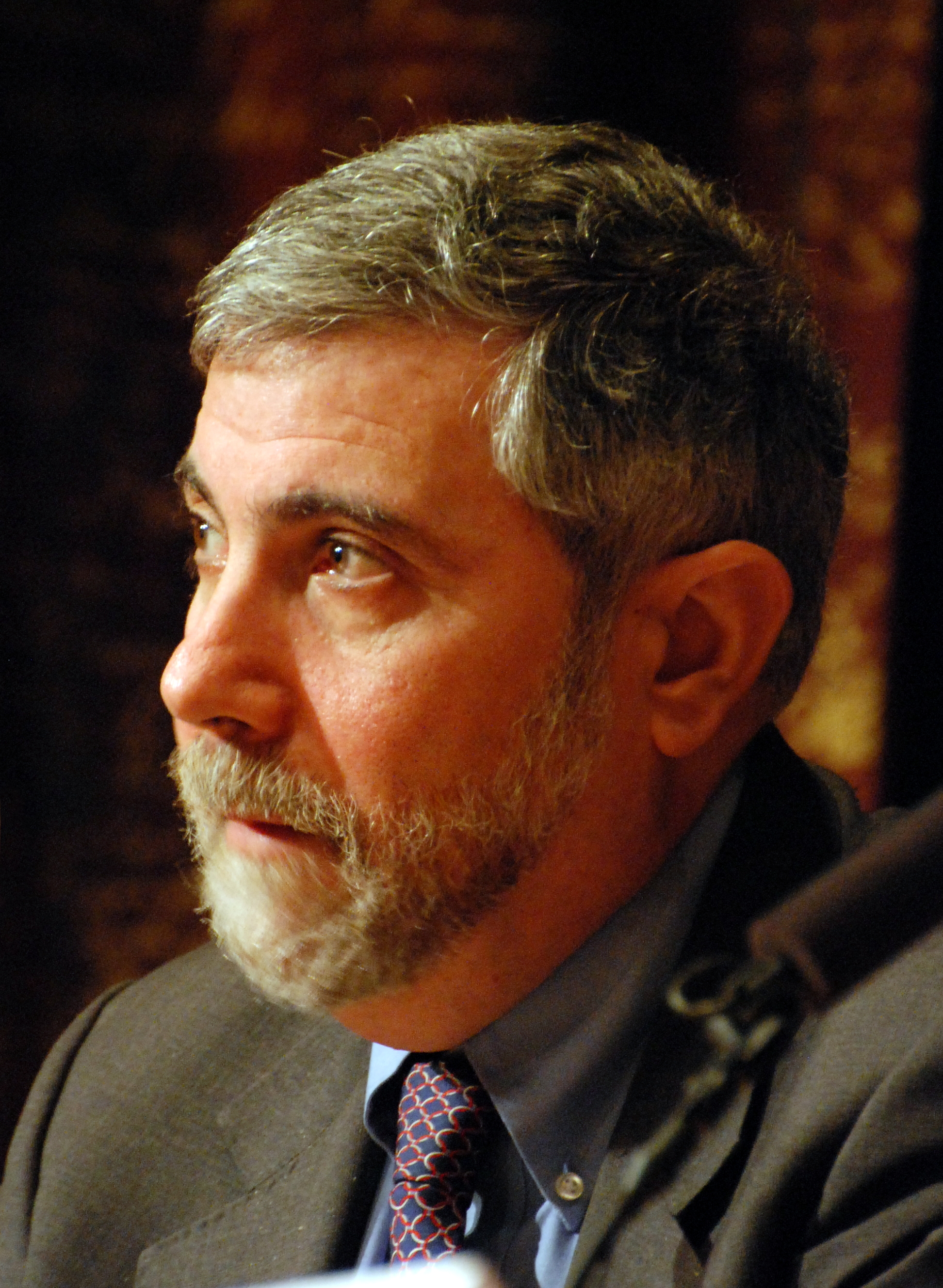
Economist Paul Krugman in 2008

Writing in The New York Times, economist Paul Krugman agreed with Rawls' position in which both equality of opportunity and equality of outcome were linked and suggested that "we should try to create the society each of us would want if we didn't know in advance who we'd be". Krugman favored a society in which hard-working and talented people can get rewarded for their efforts, but in which there was a "social safety net" created by taxes to help the less fortunate. Many have suggested that a society promoting equality of opportunity will resultantly see a higher degree of equality in the outcome and that equalizing a person's socioeconomic starting conditions will result in a meritocratic distribution of economic influence. Such is the basis for left-leaning market-based ideologies such as distributism, ordoliberalism, the Social market economy, and some forms of social democracy.

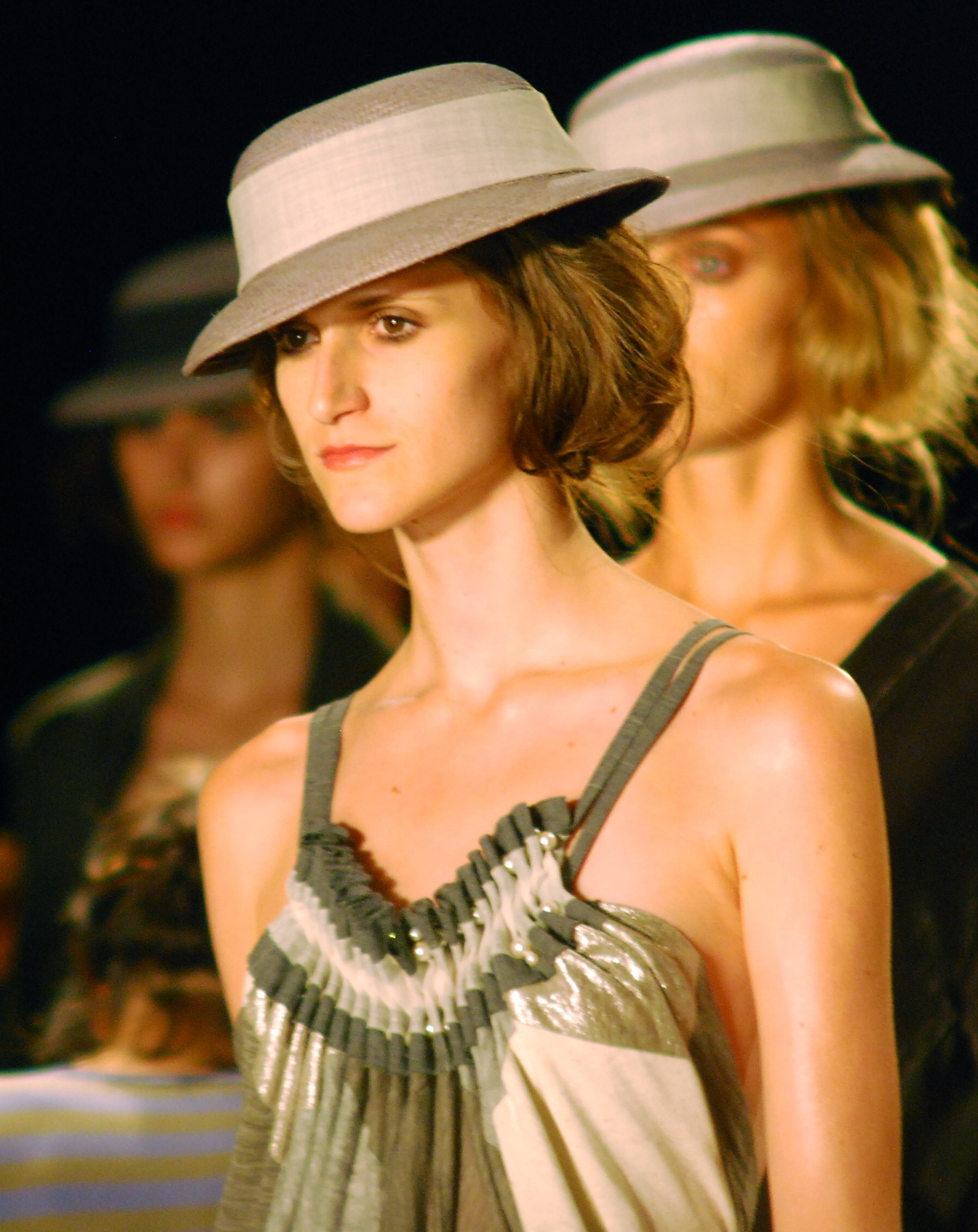
Issues about equality of outcome measured for groups have been raised about the skin color of runway models at the São Paulo Fashion Week and in 2009 quotas requiring that at least 10 percent of models be "black or indigenous" were imposed as a substantive way to counteract a "bias towards white models", according to one account.

In The Guardian, commentator Julian Glover writes that equality challenges both left-leaning and right-leaning positions and suggests that the task of left-leaning advocates is to "understand the impossibility and undesirability of equality" while the task for right-leaning advocates was to "realise that a divided and hierarchical society cannot—in the best sense of that word—be fair".

Conservatives and classical liberals criticize attempts to try to fight poverty by redistributive methods as ineffective, arguing that more serious cultural and behavioral problems lock poor people into poverty. Sometimes right-leaning positions have been criticized by left-leaning positions for oversimplifying what is meant by the term equality of outcome and for construing outcomes strictly to mean precisely equal amounts for everybody. In The Guardian, commentator Ed Rooksby criticized the right's tendency to oversimplify and suggested that serious left-leaning advocates would not construe equality to mean "absolute equality of everything". Rooksby wrote that Marx favored the position described in the phrase "from each according to his ability, to each according to his need" and argued that this did not imply strict equality of things, but that it meant that people required "different things in different proportions in order to flourish".

American libertarians and advocates of economic liberalism such as Friedrich Hayek and Milton Friedman tend to see equality of outcome negatively and argue that any effort to cause equal outcomes would necessarily and unfortunately involve coercion by government. Friedman wrote that striving for equality of outcome leaves most people "without equality and without opportunity".

According to philosopher Anne Phillips, it is simplistic to define equality in strict outcomes since questions such as what is being equalized as well as huge differences in preferences and tastes and needs is considerable, therefore they ask: exactly what is being equalized? Author Mark Penn wrote that "the fundamental principle of centrism in the 1990s was that people would neither be left to fend for themselves nor guaranteed equality of outcome—they would be given the tools they needed to achieve the American dream if they worked hard". On the topic of fairness, Glover writes that fairness "compels no action", comparing it to an "atmospheric ideal, an invisible gas, a miasma" and using an expression by Winston Churchill, a "happy thought".

Bernard Shaw was one of the few socialist theorists to advocate complete economic equality of outcome right at the beginning of World War One. The vast majority of socialists view an ideal economy as one where remuneration is at least somewhat proportional to the degree of effort and personal sacrifice expended by individuals in the productive process. This latter concept was expressed by Karl Marx's famous maxim: "To each according to his contribution".

=== Substantive equality ===
Substantive equality looks at context to achieve outcomes that are considered desirable. It moves beyond or away from individual merit-based comparison to account for the broader context that affects personal merit; it is dynamic in its ambition to influence that context and improve desired outcomes, internalizing various collective or societal dimensions along the way. Depending on its angle or agenda, substantive equality and non-discrimination aim to redress existing or historical disadvantages; to address stigma, stereotyping, prejudice or violence; to enhance voice and participation or to accommodate differences and achieve structural societal change.

The substantive equality embraced by Court of Justice of the European Union focuses on equality of outcomes for group characteristics and group outcomes.

=== Conflation with Marxism, socialism and communism ===
The German economist and philosopher Karl Marx and his collaborator Friedrich Engels are sometimes mistakenly characterized as egalitarians, and the economic systems of socialism and communism are sometimes misconstrued as being based on equality of outcome. In reality, both Marx and Engels regarded the concept of equality as a political concept and value, suited to promoting bourgeois interests, focusing their analysis on more concrete issues such as the laws of motion of capitalism and exploitation based on economic and materialist logic. Marx renounced theorizing on moral concepts and refrained from advocating principles of justice. Marx's views on equality were informed by his analysis of the development of the productive forces in society.

Socialism is based on a principle of distribution whereby individuals receive compensation proportional to the amount of energy and labor they contribute to production ("To each according to his contribution"), which by definition precludes equal outcomes in income distribution. In Marxist theory, communism is based on a principle whereby access to goods and services is based on free and open access (often referred to as distribution based on one's needs); Marx stressed free access to the articles of consumption. Hence the "equality" in a communist society is not about total equality or equality of outcome, but about equal and free access to the articles of consumption. Marx argued that free access to consumption would enable individuals to overcome alienation. In Critique of the Gotha Programme, Marx also took into account how some were more capable than others (such as in height, marital status, skills, etc.), furthering his point against absolute equality.

As opposed to Marxists, George Bernard Shaw, a Fabian socialist, would have socialists place more emphasis on equal distribution rather than production. He developed his ideas on economic equality (and its implications for social, democratic, legal, military, and gender concerns) in lectures and articles in the ten years following the writing of his 1905 play on poverty and power, Major Barbara, at the same time as his Fabian colleague Beatrice Webb as the primary author of the 1909 Minority Report on the Poor Law, along with her husband Sidney Webb, was proposing to abolish poverty in industrial societies by introducing what we now call the welfare state. In the 1907 preface to Major Barbara, Shaw was probably the first to argue for what he called "Universal Pensions for Life", now known as universal incomes. Following major lectures on equality in 1910 and 1913, he gave his fullest exposition of economic equality in a series of six highly publicized Fabian public lectures at the end of 1914, "On Redistribution of Income"—a phrase, as he put it at the time, that he wanted to get into circulation. Although largely unacknowledged, most of the terms of the equality debate since (such as for example, John Rawls and many recent writers on inequality) are as outlined in some detail in Shaw's 1914 series of lectures, where he argued for a gradual incremental process towards equal incomes, mostly by levelling-up from the bottom through union activity and labor laws, minimum and basic incomes as well as by using such mechanisms as income and wealth (inheritance) taxes to prevent incomes rising at the top. In the end, the goal would have been achieved not at absolute equality, but when any remaining income differences would not yield any significant social difference. Like the later Fabian, W. H. Tawney, who further developed the equality debate, Shaw considered equality of opportunity as obsolete without economic equality. Shaw later expanded his pre-World War One work on equality into his 1928 political treatise, The Intelligent Woman's Guide to Socialism and Capitalism.

== Related concepts ==
Equality of outcome is often compared to related concepts of equality, particularly with equality of opportunity. Generally, most senses of the concept of equality are controversial and are seen differently by people having different political perspectives, but of all of the terms relating to equality, equality of outcome is the most controversial and contentious.

Equality of opportunity generally describes fair competition for important jobs and positions such that contenders have equal chances to win such positions, and applicants are not judged or hampered by unfair or arbitrary discrimination. It entails the "elimination of arbitrary discrimination in the process of selection". The term is usually applied in workplace situations, but has been applied in other areas as well such as housing, lending, and voting rights. The essence is that job seekers have "an equal chance to compete within the framework of goals and the structure of rules established", according to one view. It is generally seen as a procedural value of fair treatment by the rules.

Equality of autonomy is a relatively new concept, a sort of hybrid notion that has been developed by philosopher Amartya Sen and can be thought of as "the ability and means to choose our life course should be spread as equally as possible across society". It is an equal shot at empowerment or a chance to develop up to his or her potential rather than equal goods or equal chances. In a teaching guide, equality of autonomy was explained as "equality in the degree of empowerment people have to make decisions affecting their lives, how much choice and control they have given their circumstances". Sen's approach requires "active intervention of institutions like the state into people's lives" but with an aim towards "fostering of people's self-creation rather than their living conditions". Sen argued that "the ability to convert incomes into opportunities is affected by a multiplicity of individual and social differences that mean some people will need more than others to achieve the same range of capabilities".

Equality of process is related to the general notion of fair treatment and can be thought of as "dealing with inequalities in treatment through discrimination by other individuals and groups, or by institutions and systems, including not being treated with dignity and respect", according to one definition.

Equality of perception is an uncommonly used term meaning that "person should be perceived as being of equal worth".

=== Outcome versus opportunity ===
Equality of outcome and equality of opportunity have been contrasted to a great extent. When evaluated in a simple context, the more preferred term in contemporary political discourse is equality of opportunity (or, meaning the same thing, the common variant "equal opportunities"), which the public as well as individual commentators see as the nicer or more "well-mannered" of the two terms. A mainstream political view is that the comparison of the two terms is valid, but that they are somewhat mutually exclusive in the sense that striving for either type of equality would require sacrificing the other to an extent and that achieving equality of opportunity necessarily brings about "certain inequalities of outcome". For example, striving for equal outcomes might require discriminating between groups to achieve these outcomes; or striving for equal opportunities in some types of treatment might lead to unequal results. Equality seeking policies may also have a redistributive focus.

However, the two concepts are not always cleanly contrasted since the notion of equality is complex. Some analysts see the two concepts not as polar opposites but as highly related such that they can not be understood without considering the other term.

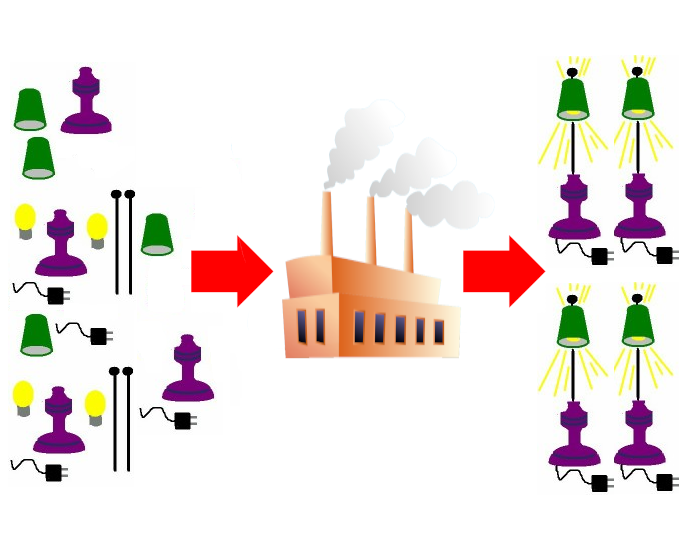
A lamp assembly factory, where components are combined to make lamps

In a lamp assembly factory, for example, equality of outcome might mean that workers are all paid equally regardless of how many lamps of acceptable quality they make, which also implies that the workers cannot be fired for producing too few lamps of acceptable quality. This can be contrasted with a payment system such as piece work, which requires that every worker is paid a fixed amount of money per lamp of acceptable quality that the worker makes.

In contemporary political discourse, the two concepts of equality of outcome have sometimes been criticized as the "politics of envy" and are often seen as more "controversial" than equality of opportunity. One wrote that "equality of opportunity is then set up as the mild-mannered alternative to the craziness of outcome equality". One theorist suggested that an over-emphasis on either type of equality can "come into conflict with individual freedom and merit".

Critics of equality of opportunity note that while it is relatively easier to deal with unfairness for people with different races or genders, it is much harder to deal with the social class since "one can never entirely extract people from their ancestry and upbringing". As a result, critics contend that efforts to bring fairness by equal opportunity are stymied by the difficulty of people having differing starting points at the beginning of the socio-economic competition. A person born into an upper-middle-class family will have greater advantages by the mere fact of birth than a person born into poverty.

One newspaper account criticized the discussion by politicians on the subject of equality as "weasely" and thought that the term was politically correct and vague. Furthermore, when comparing equality of opportunity with equality of outcome, the sense was that the latter type was "worse" for society. Equality of outcome may be incorporated into a philosophy that ultimately seeks equality of opportunity. Moving towards a higher equality of outcome (albeit not perfectly equal) can lead to an environment more adept at providing equality of opportunity by eliminating conditions that restrict the possibility for members of society to fulfill their potential. For example, a child born in a poor, dangerous neighborhood with poor schools and little access to healthcare may be significantly disadvantaged in his attempts to maximize use of talents, no matter how fine his work ethic. Thus even proponents of meritocracy may promote some level of equality of outcome to create a society capable of truly providing equality of opportunity.

While outcomes can usually be measured with a great degree of precision, it is much more difficult to measure the intangible nature of opportunities. That is one reason why many proponents of equal opportunity use measures of equality of outcome to judge success. Analyst Anne Phillips argued that the proper way to assess the effectiveness of the hard-to-measure concept of equality of opportunity is by the extent of the equality of outcome. Nevertheless, she described a single criterion of equality of outcome as problematic—the measure of "preference satisfaction" was "ideologically loaded" while other measures such as income or wealth were inadequate and she advocated an approach which combined data about resources, occupations and roles.

To the extent that inequalities can be passed from one generation to another through tangible gifts and wealth inheritance, some claim that equality of opportunity for children cannot be achieved without equality of outcome for parents. Moreover, access to social institutions is affected by equality of outcome and it is further claimed that rigging equality of outcome can be a way to prevent co-option of non-economic institutions important to social control and policy formation, such as the legal system, media or the electoral process, by powerful individuals or coalitions of wealthy people.

Purportedly, greater equality of outcome is likely to reduce relative poverty, leading to a more cohesive society. However, if taken to an extreme it may lead to greater absolute poverty, if it negatively affects a country's GDP by damaging workers' sense of work ethic by destroying incentives to work harder. Critics of equality of outcome believe that it is more important to raise the standard of living of the poorest in absolute terms. Some critics additionally disagree with the concept of equality of outcome on philosophical grounds. Still others note that poor people of low social status often have a drive, hunger and ambition which ultimately lets them achieve better economic and social outcomes than their initially more advantaged rivals.

A related argument that is often encountered in education, especially in the debates on the grammar school in the United Kingdom and in the debates on gifted education in various countries, says that people by nature have differing levels of ability and initiative which result in some achieving better outcomes than others and it is, therefore, impossible to ensure equality of outcome without imposing inequality of opportunity.

== See also ==
- Affirmative action
- Anarcho-communism
- Classless society
- Distributive justice
- Egalitarianism
- Equality before the law
- Equity of condition
- Income inequality metrics
- Inequity aversion
- Parable of the Workers in the Vineyard
- Relative deprivation
- Substantive equality
- Substantive rights
