= Adhesion procedure =

Adhesion procedure, adhesive procedure or ancillary proceedings is a procedure through which a court of law can rule on compensation for the victim of a criminal offense. Rather than pursuing damages in a separate civil action, the victim files a civil claim against the offender as a part of a criminal trial.

This system exists in some civil law jurisdictions, including Austria, the Czech Republic, Germany, the Netherlands, Belgium, and Slovakia.

== Sources ==
- matarka.hu
