= Nutritional anthropology =

Field of study

Nutritional anthropology is the study of the interplay between human biology, economic systems, nutritional status and food security. If economic and environmental changes in a community affect access to food, food security, and dietary health, then this interplay between culture and biology is in turn connected to broader historical and economic trends associated with globalization. Nutritional status affects overall health status, work performance potential, and the overall potential for economic development (either in terms of human development or traditional Western models) for any given group of people.

== General economics and nutrition ==
=== General economic summary ===
Most scholars construe economy as involving the production, distribution, and consumption of goods and services within and between societies. A key concept in a broad study of economies (versus a particular econometric study of commodities and stock markets) is social relations. For instance, many economic anthropologists state that the reciprocal gift exchange, competitive gift exchange, and impersonal market exchange are all reflective of dominant paradigms of social relations within a given society. The main forms of economy around most of the world today, in terms of a simple production, distribution, and consumption model, are subsistence-based and market economies. Subsistence refers to production and consumption on a small-scale of the household or community, while a market-based economy implies a much broader scale of production, distribution, and consumption. A market economy also entails the exchange of goods for currency, versus bartering commodities or being under continuing reciprocal gift exchange obligations. This is not to say that market economies do not coexist with subsistence economies and other forms, but that one type usually dominates within a given society. However, a broad array of scholarship exists, stating that market economies are rapidly increasing in importance on a global scale, even in societies that have traditionally relied much more heavily on subsistence production. This economic shift has nutritional implications that this entry will explore further.

=== Modes of production and nutrition ===
The most important step in understanding the links between economics and nutrition is to understand major modes of production that societies have used to produce the goods (and services) they have needed throughout human history. These modes are foraging, shifting cultivation, pastoralism, agriculture, and industrialism (Park 2006).

Foraging, also known as hunting and gathering, is a subsistence strategy in which a group of people gathers wild plants and hunts wild animals in order to obtain food. This strategy was the sole mode of existence for human beings for the vast majority of human history (inclusive of the archaeological and fossil record) and continued to be practiced by a few groups at least into the middle part of the 20th century. This mode of production is generally associated with small, nomadic groups of no more than fifty, also known as bands. The vast majority of foraging societies do not acknowledge exclusive ownership of land or other major resources, though they do acknowledge primary use rights for groups and people may individually possess small objects or tools such as a bow or cutting tools. Because foraging usually involves frequent movement and taking food naturally available rather than altering landscapes for production, research suggests that foraging has a minimal negative environmental impact compared to other modes of production. Though foragers are generally limited in absolute amount of food available in a given area, foraging groups such as the !Kung in the Kalahari Desert have often been cited as having a more diverse diet and spending less time per week procuring food than societies that practice other modes of production such as intensive agriculture.

Shifting cultivation is a mode of production involving the low intensity production of plant-based foods; this mode is also known as horticulture or ‘slash and burn agriculture’ in some texts. Horticultural societies are generally situated in semi-sedentary villages of a few hundred that clear a field and burn the cleared vegetation in order to use the ashes to nourish the soil (hence the phrase slash and burn). Next, the group plants a crop or crops in this clearing and uses it for cultivation for several years. At the end of this period, the entire village relocates and starts the process anew, leaving the old clearing fallow for a period of decades in order to allow regeneration through the regrowth of wild vegetation. These food items can be supplemented through the raising of livestock, hunting wild game, and in many cases with the gathering of wild plants (Miller 2005; Park 2006). Though periodic movement precludes absolute permanent ownership of land, some horticultural societies fiercely defend current territories and practice violence against neighboring groups. For instance, Napoleon Chagnon (1997) depicts the Yanamamo of Venezuela and Brazil as the “Fierce People”, though others have been highly critical of Chagnon's account of this society. Horticulture can also produce a broad diet, and in some cases more food per unit of land area than foraging. Though populations of horticulturalists tend to have greater density than those of foragers, they are generally less dense than those which practice other modes of production. If practiced on a small scale, over a large area, with long fallow periods, horticulture has less negative environmental impact than agriculture or industrialism, but more than foraging (Miller 2005). Generally, horticulture coincides with a subsistence type of economy in terms of production, distribution.

Pastoralism, defined as reliance on products from livestock coupled with a seasonal nomadic herding tradition, is similar to horticulture in that it is extensive in its use of land area. Social groups in pastoral societies tend to have similar numbers and population density to horticultural societies. Pastoral societies often trade animal products with agricultural societies for plant based foods to augment their diet. Frequent movement often means that pastoralism has a similar environmental impact to horticulture, though instances of overgrazing, and consequent land degradation (see later subsection under Globalization and Nutrition), have been sited in some cases. Pastoralism generally entails a greater reliance on meat or other animal products, such as milk or blood, than other modes of production. This mode of production has a similar use rights profile to shifting cultivation. Traditionally, pastoralism has coincided with a subsistence based economy, but in the last several decades, some pastoralist societies, such as Mongolia, have herded animals and practiced nomadic living patterns but have produced livestock primarily for market exchange.

Agriculture, sometimes referred to as intensive agriculture, involves clearing and using the same plot of land for an extended period, sometimes several generations; it also involves the use of plows and draft animals in the preparation of land for planting and the cultivation of crops. Agriculture often supports much higher population densities than other modes of production (except industrialism) and agricultural societies can range in population from a few thousand into the millions. Though agriculture produces more food per unit of land area than the previously mentioned modes, the tendency of agricultural societies to focus on relatively few crops has often meant that these societies have much less diverse diets than foraging and horticultural societies. There is some archaeological and fossil evidence that populations in transition from foraging to agriculture have tended to suffer reduced stature, reduced musculature, and to exhibit other markers of malnutrition. Research has suggested that agriculture paradoxically allows a higher, but less healthy population for a given area. The advent of agriculture has marked that advent of social stratification in many parts of the world, with marked differentials in access to resources between segments of the same society. This mode of production also is more likely to entail permanent individual or family ownership of particular tracts of land than previously mentioned modes of production. Agriculture has co-occurred with both subsistence and market economies, often with a single society exhibiting some degree of both types of economies and has a more negative impact on the environment than the aforementioned modes of production.

Industrialism combines agriculture with mechanized industrial production of goods through the use of fossil fuels. Additionally, industrial societies use mechanized equipment in order to prepare land for planting, harvest crops, and distribute food to locations distant from where the original crops were planted. Industrialism shows similar trends to agriculture in terms of population density, and environmental impact, except to a much greater degree. Dietary diversity can be highly variable under an industrial mode of production and can depend on access to foods produced for local subsistence on the one hand, or to income level and purchasing power visa vie foods available in food markets (Leatherman and Goodman 2005). Dietary diversity and nutritional health often correlate with the degree of social stratification within an industrial society and sometimes between societies. With the exception of Soviet model states, industrial societies are heavily based on the concept of private property rights and the accumulation of profit through “free enterprise”.

The general trend for many societies over the past several millennia has been toward agriculture, and in the past two centuries, toward industrialism. Though these two modes of production are by no means superior to other modes in every respect, the fact that societies that practice them tend to have larger populations, higher population densities, and a more complex social structure has correlated with the geographic expansion of agricultural and industrial societies at the expense of societies emphasizing other modes of production. Concurrent with this trend toward intensified agricultural and industrial production has been the rise of the social and economic paradigm of capitalism, which entails the production and sale of goods and services in the market place in order to produce a profit. These trends have had profound implications for nutritional status for human beings on a global scale. In order to discern how broader economic and environmental trends affect a community's food systems, food security, and nutritional status, it is important to summarize one of the most significant economic and ecological phenomena today, globalization. The next section will treat the linkages between economic and ideological trends over the last several centuries and environmental and political economic factors affecting access to food and nutritional status.

== Globalization and nutrition ==
=== General summary of globalization ===
Though the scope and dimensions of globalization as most people currently construe it are of fairly recent origin, the broader phenomenon of global interconnections through cultural diffusion and trade is several centuries old. Starting in the late Fifteenth century, European powers expanded beyond the European sub-continent to found colonies in the Americas, East Asia, South Asia, Australia and Oceania. This expansion has had a profound impact in terms of wealth creation in Europe and extraction elsewhere, cultural changes in most of the world's societies, and biological phenomena such as the introduction of several infectious diseases into the Western Hemisphere, which caused tremendous disruption and population reduction for indigenous societies there. These events, far from occurring coincidentally, have had synergistic relationships, in one vivid example, the decimation of Amerindian populations through infectious disease often preceding and facilitating subsequent conquest by European powers. Such conquests in turn have often had significantly negative impacts on internal cohesion, ability of populations to attain adequate resources for their own subsistence and traditional social obligations, and local environments for colonized societies. In order to understand the effects of globalization on nutritional status and food security, it is important to understand the historical circumstances that have led to contemporary globalization, and that still manifest themselves in political, social, material, and physical/health differentials between (and within) the different peoples of the world today.

“The Rise of the Merchant, Industrialist, and Capital Controller,” written by Richard Robbins in 2005, uses a hypothetical scenario of the reader as a “merchant adventurer” to detail economic world history starting in 1400. In 1400, China was arguably the most cosmopolitan and technologically complex society in the world. It was a center of trade, along with the Middle East, East Africa, and ports on the Mediterranean Sea. Western Europe, while playing a part in this network, did not dominate it by any means; one could argue for European marginalization in fact. This circumstance began to change when the Europeans “discovered” the Americas, setting in motion a process that would disrupt many societies and devastate indigenous populations of the Western Hemisphere. The dominant economic paradigm of this period was mercantilism, whereby European merchants began to achieve power in world markets and in relation to European governing aristocracies. Robbins cites example of government protections that facilitated mercantilism in the form of exclusive proprietary rights to trading companies and armies used to protect trade by force if necessary. He details instances of government protection such as the example of how Great Britain destroyed India's textile industry and turned that society into an importer of textiles is especially illustrative. In dealing with imperialism, capitalism, and the rise of corporations, Robins further details the manner in which the “West” transformed various regions/peoples from proactive participants on global trade networks into sources of raw materials and consumers of European or North American exports. This history of world trade is important to the consideration of current issues of disparity of power and wealth.

There are many critiques the policies of the World Bank and the International Monetary Fund (IMF) in the promotion of high intensity capital investment in developing nations (e.g. Weller et al. 2001; Fort et al. 2004). Disparities within nations and growing poverty rates in many nations also provide compelling evidence of the idea that the rewards of economic globalization are uneven at best. There is a great deal of literature about globalization and increases in health disparities both between and within countries.

Finally, there is Amartya Sen with Development as Freedom (1999); here Sen disagrees about whether or not the world's poor are getting poorer, but also maintains that this criterion is not the most important. He argues that relative disparities and power differentials are the most important problems of globalization. Sen states that the increasing interconnection of the Worlds societies can have positive benefits, but that the disparities and opportunities for exploitation must be mitigated to the greatest extent possible, if they can not be eliminated outright. Sen provides groundwork for a nuanced middle ground between unabashed proponents and opponents of globalization.

Far from being universally decried, the recent accelerated expansion of western capitalism, geographically, politically, and ideologically, has been lauded in many quarters. International and bilateral agencies such as the World Bank, IMF, and the United States Agency for International Development (USAID) have utilized free market capitalist theories extensively in development programs in many corners of the globe whose state aims are to promote economic growth for communities and nation-states and to alleviate poverty. Likewise prominent individuals such as former U.S. Federal Reserve Board Chair Alan Greenspan and U.S. based journalist Thomas Friedman have held forth extensively about the possibilities of economic and social improvement in developed and developing nations alike, mainly through increased access to appropriate education, sophisticated communications and transportation technology, and a paradigm of social and economic “flexibility”, where individuals and communities who can best adapt to rapid changes in the role of governments and the particular economic base of a given location would be in the best position to take advantage of the opportunities offered by economic, political, and cultural globalization. This free market ideology is also predominant in the policies and procedures of the World Trade Organization (WTO) and many transnational corporations (TNC's), most of which are headquartered in developed nations. The rise of Capitalism and the free market society have indeed increased and exacerbated food insecurity in the world's poor due to the structure and function of a Capitalist society where only those who can afford to buy food to feed themselves are the only ones with access to a secure and adequate food supply. Food is no longer a human right to life and health due to the Capitalist approach to commodifying food in the free market society that as a result of globalization has spread all over the world. Transnational corporations and trade organizations such as NAFTA facilitate this approach of commodifying our world's food supply by enforcing laws and regulations which further deepen the inequality of wealth and unequal distribution of common goods such as food between the rich and the poor.

In contrast to the “western” economic model, most early social scholarship about economics stressed the predominance of reciprocity as a primary driving force in traditional non-Western societies. Marcel Mauss referred to the gift as a “total social phenomenon”, fraught with ritual and socio political as well as material significance. Though some objects, such as armbands or shell necklaces in the kula ring that runs through several island groups off the coast of Papua New Guinea, might induce some form of prestige based competition, the terms of exchange are significantly different from a monetary transaction under a modern capitalist system. While Appadurai actually describes ritual objects as a type of commodity, he couches them as such under significantly different terms than the market-based types of commodity normally treated by economists. Annette Wiener criticizes earlier works in anthropology and sociology that depicted “simple” societies utilizing a simple version of reciprocity. Whatever the theoretical stance of social scholars on non-western traditional economies, there is a consensus that such essentials as food and water tended to be shared more freely than other types of goods or services. This dynamic tends to change with the introduction of a market-based economy into a society, with food coming to be increasingly treated as a commodity, rather than a social good or an essential component of health and survival.

Regardless of one's overall perspective on the costs and benefits of economic globalization, there are several examples in social scholarship of groups of people suffering a decline in nutritional statues subsequent to the introduction of a capitalist market-based economy into an area that has previously practiced an economy based more on subsistence production and reciprocity. Although some people's food security may improve with access to more steady income, many people in communities that have heretofore practiced a subsistence economy may experienced greater food insecurity and nutritional status due to insufficient income to replace the foods no longer produced by a household. Whether the growth of food insecurity and socioeconomic disparities in many parts of the world in recent decades is an inherent part of globalization or a temporary “growing pain” until economic development attains its full efficacy is a matter of debate, but there are many empirical examples of communities being dissociated from traditional means of food production and not being able to find sufficient wages in a new market economy to achieve a balanced and calorically sufficient diet. Several factors affecting food security and nutritional status range on a continuum from more physical phenomena such as land degradation and land expropriation, to more culturally and socio-politically driven things such as cash cropping, dietary delocalization, and commoditization of food; one important caveat is that all of these trends are interconnected and fall under a broad category of socio-cultural and economic disruptions and dislocations under the current paradigm of globalization.

=== Land degradation ===
Though Blakie and Brookfield acknowledge the problematic aspects of defining land degradation, with definitional variation depending in large part on the scholar or stakeholder in question, they do outline a general idea of reduced soil fertility and reduced ability of a given area of land to provide for people's subsistence needs, as compared to earlier periods in human history on that same land area. Paul Farmer discusses the effects of land degradation in central Haiti on local people's ability to produce sufficient food for their families within the environs of their own communities. Farmer links malnutrition in a Haitian village with vulnerability to infectious diseases, including tuberculosis and HIV/AIDS, both in terms of chance of infection and severity of symptoms for those infected. While the extremely low percentage of the U.S. population involved in agriculture strongly suggests that direct access to arable land is not an absolute necessity for food security and nutritional health, land degradation in many developing nations is accelerating the rate of rural to urban migration at a more accelerated rate than most major cities are equipped to handle. Leatherman and Goodman also allude to land degradation co-occurring with decreases in food security and nutritional status in some communities in the Mexican state of Quintana Roo. Walter Edgar discusses the correlation between land degradation and economic disruption, as well as nutritional hardship, in the U.S. state of South Carolina in the decades following the Reconstruction Period. Coupled with land expropriation, land degradation has the effect of thrusting unprepared subsistence producers or other peasant farmers into a fast-paced and complex market economy heavily influence by policy makers who are far removed from the concerns and worldview of small scale farmers in developing countries.

=== Land expropriation ===
Occurring for a variety of reasons, land expropriation, or the disruption of traditional ownership of land by more powerful interests such as local elites, governments, or transnational corporations, can also markedly affect nutritional status. Robbins details examples in Mexico of peasants facing land expropriation in the face of agribusiness consolidation under the North American Free Trade Agreement (NAFTA); in many cases, these subsistence producers are forced either to migrate to cities or work sporadically as agricultural labors. Since most if not all food must be purchased under these circumstances, the food security and nutritional status of these newer additions to the pool of poor unskilled labor often declines. Another common impetus for expropriation is non-agricultural “economic development”, often in the form of tourism. In one Example, Donald MacLeod details curtailment of subsistence activities, mainly fishing and cultivation, in areas of the Canary Islands in the face of pressures from tourism interests wishing to monopolize the “pristine” beauty of locations catering to Germans and other tourists from EU nations. Ironically, local people see relatively little monetary benefit from the rise in tourism, as many vacations are planned by German tour companies (linked with all-inclusive German-owned resorts in the Canary Islands) and are paid for before tourists ever arrive at their vacation destination. Leatherman and Goodman and Daltabuit point to circumscription of land available for traditional milpa horticultural production in communities in the Mexican state of Quintana Roo in the face of growing demands for land for resorts by tourism interests, under the auspices of the Mexican national government. One expropriation scenario with a long history is cash cropping, where crops grown for revenue from exports are prioritized over crops grown for local consumption.

=== Cash cropping ===
In Sweetness and Power, written by Sidney Mintz in 1985, details examples of mono-cropping, or planting massive areas with one cash crop, in several Caribbean Islands, including Cuba. He states that Cuba went from being an economically diverse place with many small scale subsistence producers to a mono-crop plantation system dependent on cash from its sugar crop and substantial food imports for the later centuries of the Spanish Colonial Period. He describes Cuba as an example of growing impoverishment and malnutrition concurrent with increasing concentration of land and other resources in fewer hands. Gross and Underwood illustrate the mid Twentieth Century example of the advent of sisal production in Northeastern Brazil. These authors detail a vicious cycle of the unfulfilled promises of sisal production for smallholders; because owners of sisal processing machines did not think small farms worth their time, small holders could not process and sell their sisal and were often forced to work as laborers on large farms. Sisal is cited as being particularly insidious because it is hard to eradicate once introduced and makes subsequent subsistence production virtually impossible. This article treats a common situation of households prioritizing working males in food allocation, exposing growing children to malnutrition, particularly under nutrition and micronutrient deficiency, and all of its attendant ills. Edgar discusses how exclusive planting of cotton in the Southeastern United States during the late Nineteenth and early Twentieth Centuries caused substantial land degradation, lead to a great deal of land expropriation from small scale farmers, and occurred in a context of widespread malnutrition. Especially in Today's complex, accelerated version of globalization, cash cropping is intimately linked with the delocalization of diets and the commoditization of food and has profound, though varied, implications for food security and nutritional status.

=== Delocalization and commoditization ===
In “Diet and Delocalization: Dietary Challenges since 1750”, Pelto and Pelto trace the concurrent historical development of global capitalism and dietary delocalization, a process in which increasing portions of diet for a household or community come from an increasing distance away from that same community. Nutritional scholars explicitly state that delocalization does not necessarily entail increased food insecurity and malnutrition, but that access to an adequate diet becomes increasingly removed from local control and increasingly contingent on access to hard cash or some other non-food precious resource. Leatherman and Goodman discuss the ironic result of their study in Quintana Roo that both the groups with the best and worst food security and nutritional status worked in service industries related to tourism, with the median group being a milpa community. They differentiate between those with stable employment and income who have access to a wide variety of foods on a regular basis and those with sporadic employment who struggle for caloric sufficiency within the household and have low dietary diversity. The main import of these examples is not that delocalization is universally negative, but that it tends to increase disparities of food security and nutritional status within and between social groups, with some segments suffering marked degradation of both.

Closely linked with delocalization is food commoditization, or the treatment of food primarily as a market commodity, rather than prioritizing other uses, such as sustenance, human rights entitlement, or social relations. Dewey describes the deleterious effects of food commoditization for rural communities in Central America, to include reductions in food security and nutritional status. Much of tourism literature details marked increases in the commoditization of food subsequent to the introduction of tourism as a form of market based economic development. Dewey and Robbins also state that when food is primarily seen as a commodity by powerful interests, not only does such an ideology increase delocalization, but also land degradation and expropriation as elite land owners or transnational corporations cause massive social and ecological disruptions in the process of mono-cropping food crops over broad swaths of land in order to reap maximum profits from overseas sales. Indeed, delocalization and commoditization have significant potential to diminish food security and nutritional status in poor communities over broad areas of the world.

=== Dietary health ===
In terms of food security and dietary diversity, which are defined as reliable access to a caloric sufficiency and access to a wide variety of macro and micro nutrients in order to maintain nutritive balance, respectively, the commoditization of food plays a key role in diminishing the control local populations have over their own subsistence production. Delocalization of food systems, which Pelto and Pelto define as taking production of food out of a local subsistence context and tying it to geographically broader market systems, can precipitate marked cultural and nutritional disruption. Likewise commoditization of food systems, defined as a paradigm shift from one of subsistence or social significances shift toward one which treats food primarily as a market commodity, can affect dietary health as well as collective identity. Commoditization tends to shift food security and dietary diversity away from integrated kinship or other reciprocal distribution networks toward being an issue of who can best compete in a free market to achieve these ends; indeed, commoditization has often been linked to breakdowns in food entitlements, which are defined as cultural or social norms that ensure food access for all members of a given social group.

The deleterious effects of mild to moderate malnutrition (MMM) not only pertain to caloric insufficiency (often closely associated with food insecurity) but also to poor dietary diversity; in particular, curtailed access to protein, complex carbohydrates, zinc, iron, and other micronutrients. The ways in which undernutrition and micronutrient deficiency interact with other health effects are myriad. The most obvious manifestation of MMM, stunting is defined as height and or weight below the standard range for a particular age group. However, far from being a mere difference in height and weight, stunting was correlated with a wide variety of health effects. Closely related to stunting, level of physical activity closely articulates with nutritional status and affects childhood development. Chronically malnourished infants and toddlers showed decreased physical activity compared to supplemented groups or those who are adequately nourished.

Perhaps, the most critical facets of human development correlated to nutrition levels are behavior and cognition; development in these two areas could have profound effects on life chances for individuals and populations. In comparing a group of southern Mexican children subject to MMM and a group in the same region who received dietary supplements, Chavez et al. show a relation between MMM and poorer school performance; unsupplemented children showed poorer participation, greater degree of in-class distraction, more sleeping in class, and poorer performance on standardized tests. In addition, malnourished children showed poorer scores on intelligence quotient (I.Q.) tests than their supplemented counterparts.

Of all the aspects of human existence, sexual reproduction may have the most detailed articulation with malnutrition. In populations subject to MMM, menarche occurs later (15.5 years) than in adequately nourished populations; an early average menopause (40.5 years) makes for a relatively short reproductive period for women in the study area for Chavez et al. Because of longer postpartum periods of amenorrhea, birth spacing was an average of 27 months, versus 19 months.Though longer birth spacing can help control population growth, the evidence that Chavez et al. present suggest a curtailing of reproductive choice and adaptability due to malnutrition. This study also linked maternal MMM with higher infant and young child mortality.

Another effect of MMM crucial to life chances is work capacity; MMM shows a cyclical pattern of decreasing work capacity and its rewards, further exacerbating the problem. Allen found a correlation between reduced VO2 max rates among MMM populations and decreased muscular strength and endurance in the performance of strenuous manual labor. Although personal motivation can have a strong positive impact on individual work performance, better muscular development associated with a history of adequate nutrition increases overall work capacity, irrespective of effort. Among Jamaican cane cutters, those within normal size range cut more cane than those who showed stunting. One cultural variation in this trend was found among MMM Guatemalan workers who put forth work effort comparable to better nourished counterparts, but were likely to engage in resting behavior than in recreational or social activity during off hours. In wage economies where workers get paid in proportion to productive output, reduced work capacity can translate to reduced food security, increasing the risk of MMM.

Additionally, malnutrition and infectious disease have a synergistic relationship that can lead to spiraling health deterioration. According to Allen, the incidence of infectious disease does not vary significantly between MMM and adequately nourished populations, but the duration and severity of disease episodes is greater for MMM populations. A key reason for this disparity is that infectious disease often results in poor food intake and nutrient absorption. Not only do sick people generally eat little, but what they do eat is often of minimal benefit due to nausea and diarrhea.

Aside from MMM due to under-nutrition or micro-nutrient deficiency, over-nutrition, defined as the consumption of too many calories for one's body size and physical activity level, is also becoming an increasingly significant problem for much of the World. Overnutrition has been associated with obesity, which the USDA and McEwen and Seeman correlate with increased risk of type II diabetes, cardiovascular disease, and stroke. Overnutrition is also often associated with the co-occurrence of caloric sufficiency (or over-sufficiency) and micronutrient deficiency, as is often the case where processed foods that are high in calories, but low in most nutrients, increase in dietary prominence. Leatherman and Goodman and Guest and Jones discuss the growing coincidence of stunting and other symptoms of MMM and obesity within developing nations, sometimes within the same community. This trend can be linked to changing economies and food practices in much of the World under contemporary economic globalization.

Also the study conducted by Baten and Blum have illustrated changes in the effects from a particular diet of the population between 1870 and 1989. Important finding of the study was that the effect of the protein on heights of the individuals became less significant during the second half of the period under observation (i.e. 1950-1989). Moreover, the main sources of the protein were also modified. This was caused by the development of the technologies and global trade, which have likewise reduced the food shortage.

== See also ==
- Geography of food
- Food sovereignty
