= Asian values =

Political ideology that arose in the 1990s

Asian values is a political ideology that attempts to define elements of society, culture and history common to the nations of Southeast and East Asia, particularly values of commonality and collectivism for social unity and economic good—contrasting with perceived European ideals of the universal rights of all individuals.

== Definition ==
Various definitions of Asian values have been put forth. Generally, the phrase alludes to influences by Confucianism, in particular, filial piety or loyalty towards the family, corporation, and nation; the forgoing of personal freedom for the sake of society's stability and prosperity; the pursuit of academic and technological excellence; and, a strong work ethic together with thrift.

Supporters of Chinese-style authoritarian governments claim that Asian values are more appropriate for the region than Western democracy with its emphasis on individual freedoms.

"Asian values" were codified and promoted in the Bangkok Declaration of 1993, which re-emphasized the principles of sovereignty, self-determination, and non-interference in civil and political rights. They included:

- Preference for social harmony;
- Concern with socio-economic prosperity and the collective well-being of the community;
- Loyalty and respect towards figures of authority;
- Preference for collectivism and communitarianism.

== History ==
Historically, there has been no shared "Asian" identity, and the concept of unified geographical regional identity at the time of its popularity in the 20th century was not strictly limited to Asia.

Asian values gained popularity in the People's Republic of China, the Republic of China (under the Kuomintang), Malaysia (under Mahathir Mohamad), Singapore (under Lee Kuan Yew), Indonesia, South Korea and in Japan (perhaps as early as the pre World War II era). In the West, the study of Asian values was seen as a way to understand Asia and foster a closer relationship with the region.

Proponents claim the concept helped reconcile Islam, Confucianism and Hinduism in Singapore and Malaysia, and was unifying because it was different to the philosophy of the West. Lee Kuan Yew maintained that, more than economics or politics, a nation's culture determines its fate, describing Asian values as the "primacy of group interests over individual interests" which "support the total group effort necessary to develop rapidly". He described the difference between Asian values and Western values as such: "The main object is to have a well-ordered society so that everybody can have maximum enjoyment of his freedoms. This freedom can only exist in an ordered state and not in a natural state of contention and anarchy".

In Japan, a concept of "Ideals of the East" was embraced in some nationalist circles, because it challenged the West and offered the possibility of Japanese leadership in a new Asia. Some attribute the economic success of East and Southeast Asian nations in the 1960s to 1980s to "Asian values" — a third-way, Asian political model that was an alternative to totalitarianism and liberal democracy. Japan's economic miracle under the 1955 System, where the Liberal Democratic Party has been the dominant Japanese party nearly continuously in power since 1955, is used as an example of the success of this political model.

The concept of "Asian values" was also evident in the planning of the handover of Hong Kong to China in 1997.

=== Post-2000 ===
The popularity of the concept has not persisted. Some speculate it might have contributed to the religious, social, cultural and economic changes occurring in Asia in that time — for example, the Asian financial crisis and the collapse of the Suharto regime in Indonesia may have been successfully counteracted by liberal democracy.

In 2006, Jusuf Kalla, the vice-president of Indonesia, linked Asian values with the proposed East Asian Free Trade Agreement and the East Asian Community arising from the East Asia Summit. He partly defended Asian values by placing emphasis on co-operation over competition.

In East Timor, the idea of "Asian values", or "Timorese values", that diverged from the internationally understood idea of democracy emerged following the 2012 East Timorese presidential election. This election saw the incumbent José Ramos-Horta, a member of what was seen as an older generation linked to the introduction of democracy, eliminated in the first round. Ramos-Horta would, however, go on to win the presidency again a decade later, following a campaign aimed at addressing global issues affecting East Timor.

"Asian values" continues to be discussed in academia with reference to the question of the universality of human rights, as opposed to a position of cultural relativism.

== Criticism ==
A number of criticisms of Asian values have been made.

Kim Dae-jung (former President of South Korea), Amartya Kumar Sen (Indian economist, philosopher, and Nobel laureate) and Yu Ying-shih (Chinese-born American historian and sinologist) have argued that "Asian values" and the protection thereof by cultural relativism is doublespeak for suppressing freedom of speech and human rights, which are framed by proponents as "Western values" inapplicable to Asian society. Randall Peerenboom noted that many scholars "are in general agreement that some Asian governments use the rhetoric of Asian values for self-serving ends." Amartya Sen argues these so-called Asian values cannot operate because of the overriding cultural diversity found in Asia.

In 2001, Mark R. Thompson argued that the popularity of the concept waned after the 1997 Asian financial crisis, when it became evident that Asia lacked any coherent regional institutional mechanism to deal with the crisis.

The authors of a study published in 2015 claimed that rice versus wheat agriculture explain differences in analytic thinking, "implicit individualism" and innovation between various Chinese provinces. Compared to wheat farming, rice farming is a labor-intensive practice that requires cooperation among many people. However, the results of the study are controversial due to very small sample sizes for some units of analysis, questionable measurement instruments and model misspecification. Using an improved measure of individualism-collectivism, the authors of a replication study found that the conclusion of the 2015 article claiming to show evidence for the relationship between wheat versus rice farming was the result of faulty methodology.

== See also ==
- Asiacentrism
- East Asian cultural sphere
- Human rights in Asia
- Oriental despotism
- Pan-Asianism
- Lee thesis

=== Related to more specific cultures in Asia ===
- Báizuǒ
- Filipino values
- Indosphere
- Sinosphere
- Japanese values
- Nihonjinron
- Pancasila
- The White Man's Burden

=== Not directly related to Asia ===
- Axiology
- Colonial mentality
- Democracy promotion
- Golden straitjacket
- Guided democracy
- Illiberal democracy
- Liberal autocracy
- National conservatism
- Responsibility to protect (R2P)
- Social conservatism
- Universal value
- Westernization
- White savior

== Sources ==
- Loh Kok Wah F. and Khoo B. T. "Democracy in Malaysia: Discourses and Practices" Curzon Press, Richmond Surrey, 2002.
- Subramaniam S. "The Asian Values Debate: Implications for the Spread of Liberal Democracy" Asian Affairs. March 2000.
- Ankerl G. "Coexisting Contemporary Civilizations: Arabo-Muslim, Bharati, Chinese, and Western" INUPRESS, Geneva, 2002 ISBN 978-2881550041
