= Constitutional right =

Legal right protected by a sovereignty's constitution

A constitutional right can be a prerogative or a duty, a power or a restraint of power, recognized and established by a sovereign state or union of states. Constitutional rights may be expressly stipulated in a national constitution, or they may be inferred from the language of a national constitution, which is the supreme law of the land, meaning that laws that contradict it are considered unconstitutional and invalid. Usually any constitution defines the structure, functions, powers, and limits of the national government and the individual freedoms, rights, and obligations which will be protected and enforced when needed by the national authorities. Nowadays, most countries have a written constitution comprising similar or distinct constitutional rights.

Other coded set of laws have existed before the first Constitutions were developed having some similar purpose and functions, like the United Kingdom's 1215 Magna Carta or the Virginia Bill of Rights of 1776.

== Specific rights ==
=== Freedom of assembly ===
191 constitutions recognize the freedom of assembly. It may be further qualified as the right to "peaceful" or "unarmed" assembly for "legal purposes".

=== Right to vote ===
The right to vote is mentioned in 143 national constitutions. It may be additionally secret, or mandatory. There may also be restrictions based on residency, age, race, or criminal conviction.

== United States ==
=== Federal constitution ===
On September 17, 1787, the United States Constitution was signed during the Constitutional Convention (United States) which took place at the Pennsylvania State House in Philadelphia, now the Independence Hall.

On December 15, 1791, the Bill of Rights comprising the first 10 Amendments became part of the U.S. Constitution. Later on, other 17 Amendments were added. Thus, the U.S. Constitution is summing a total of 27 Amendments and 7 Articles. During all this time, only one amendment overturned a previous one, more precisely the twenty-first Amendment ratified on December 5, 1933, repealed the prohibition of alcohol established by the eighteenth Amendment on January 16, 1919.

The provisions providing for rights under the Bill of Rights were originally binding upon only the federal government. In time, most of these provisions became binding upon the states through selective incorporation into the Due Process Clause of the Fourteenth Amendment. When a provision is made binding on a state, a state can no longer restrict the rights guaranteed in that provision.

Examples of provisions made binding upon the states are the Second Amendment to the United States Constitution which was made "fully applicable" by being Incorporated with the 14th Amendment in 2010, see, McDonald vs. City of Chicago; the Sixth Amendment's guarantee of a right to confrontation of witnesses, known as the Confrontation Clause, and the various provisions of the First Amendment, guaranteeing the freedoms of speech, the press, government and assembly.

For example, the Fifth Amendment protects the right to grand jury proceedings in federal criminal cases. However, because this right was not selectively incorporated into the due process clause of the 14th amendment, it is not binding upon the states. Therefore, persons involved in state criminal proceedings as a defendant have no federal constitutional right to grand jury proceedings. Whether an individual has a right to a grand jury becomes a question of state law.

The content of each Article and Amendment of the U.S. Constitution is easy to predict since they start with a suggestive title. For example, the First Amendment guarantees the freedom of religion, speech, and the press along with the rights of assembly and petition, the Second Amendment the right to bear arms and so on. However, in order to be easier to distinguish, the legal professionals have divided the constitutional rights into two categories: process rights and substantive rights. Whereas, the process rights refer to the powers and obligations of the government with respect to individuals, the substantive rights, more diverse than the process ones, incorporate the individual freedoms endowed by the individuals creator and protected by the national government. Governments do not grant rights they only grant privilege.

=== State constitutions ===
Each of the United States has its own governing Constitution. The States Constitutions are usually longer and written in much more detail than the U.S. Constitution. For example, the Alabama Constitution has more than 600 pages and the New Jersey Constitution of 1947 is three times longer than the U.S. Constitution. The reason for this difference between the federal Constitution and the states Constitutions is what Justice Brennan called 'the new judicial federalism'. meaning that rights granted by the States Constitutions can be broader than those comprised by the federal Constitution but not narrowed.

State constitutions cannot reduce legal protections afforded by the federal charter, but they can provide additional protections. California v. Ramos, 463 U.S. 992, 1014, 103 S.Ct. 3446, 77 Lawyer's Edition 2nd 1171 (1983). Even where the text of a state constitution matches verbatim that of the federal constitution, the state document may be held to provide more to the citizen. State constitutional rights can also include those entirely unaddressed in the federal constitution, such as the right to adequate education or the right to affordable housing.

== Other nations ==
Countries whose written constitutions include a bill of rights include Germany, India, South Africa, and Japan.

The United Kingdom, as it has an uncodified constitution, does not have a constitutional bill of rights, although the Human Rights Act 1998 fulfills a similar role.

The European Convention of Human Rights applies in those nations which are members of the Council of Europe. Persons who have experienced Convention-infringing human rights violations on the territory of ECHR-signatory nations can appeal to the European Court of Human Rights.

In authoritarian regimes there are generally few or no guaranteed inalienable rights; alternatively, such rights may exist but be unobserved in practice (as was generally the case in the former Francoist Spain).

== See also ==
- Civil rights
- Communist state constitution
- Constitutional law
- Constitutionalism
- Fundamental rights
- Human rights
- Inalienable rights
- Natural rights
- Rule of law
