= Substantive rights =

Type of legal rights

Substantive rights are basic human rights possessed by people in an ordered society and include rights granted by natural law as well as substantive laws.

== Overview ==
Substantive rights involve a right to the substance of being human (life, liberty, happiness), rather than a right to a procedure to enforce that right, which is defined by procedural law. One example of substantive right is substantive equality. Substantive equality is concerned with equality of outcome for all subgroups in society including disadvantaged and marginalized groups. Substantive rights are contrasted with procedural rights, which are purely formal rules of law that only prescribe how a law ought to be enforced, rather than defining the outcome of a law. One example of procedural rights is formal equality of opportunity.

The substantive rights granted in a society are not universal and change over time, also called human rights inflation. Frequently human rights are connected with the western interpretation of rights with Judeo-Christian and/or Enlightenment heritage.

== See also ==
- Substantive democracy
