= Democracy and economic growth =

Democracy and economic growth and development have had a strong correlative and interactive relationship throughout history. Effects of democracy on economic growth and effect of economic growth on democracy can be distinguished. While evidence of a relationship is irrefutable, economists' and historians' opinions of its exact nature have been sharply split, hence the latter has been the subject of many debates and studies.

== History ==
The period of Ancient Greece 4th century B.C. and later of the Roman Empire marks the beginning not only of democracy, but as well as its connection to economic growth. The first showings in Ancient Greece in the city of Athens show a highly positive correlation with respect to economic growth and democracy. With the introduction of markets, specialization and reforms like having trial by jury, civil liberties as well as free speech, they were able to sustain a self-sufficient city at the public expense. The first document describing such a structure was written by Xenophon.

Romans enjoyed an even greater boom to their economy. Granted a lot of their success was due to their unbeatable production of iron as well as the development of trade routes i.e. Pax Romana. They ruled with a mixture of kingship, aristocracy and democracy. Despite their accomplishments from the reformed political structure, the need to invest in the military to keep their growing competition at bay, by producing less and less valuable coins, ultimately led to their collapse, recessing back to the country side and barter system.

Industrial Revolution and Great Divergence have been connected to changes in political institutions related to democratization. The period of the transition from mercantilism to liberalism in England with expansion of international trade shows the requirement of the needed change in political institutions and policies for further development. Individuals which enjoyed more political power due to their increased profits in international trade influenced the political institutions to grant them the tools to further their own goals, creating different policies, by which the economy grew as a whole.

Further ahead, after World War II over 100 nations undergone the transition of political and economic development. In the past 2 decades democratic revolution has been sweeping the whole world. There are 117 out of 191 independent states that declare themselves as democratic. Even so, while cases like Brazil, India and Mauritius have had several important economic achievements in their late-democratic period, it is not safe to imply that these countries are exemplary. Although they have performed better than expected, many more changes lie in the future, while cases like Tunisia and Libya have had a much better period before their transition to a democratic regime. Reasons being their culture, history and many others.

== Effects of democracy on economic growth ==
Democratization of a country from a non-democratic regime is usually preceded by a fall in GDP, and a volatile but expected growth in the long run. On the other hand, authoritarian regimes experience significant growth at the beginning and decline in the long run. The cause of such behavior is that non-democratic regimes, mainly authoritarian ones, are more effective at implementing decisive policies and choices as well as solving ethnic and sub-national conflicts, but are unsustainable in the long run as there is more incentive to extract money from society which in turn leads to less prosperity. Democratic regimes revolve around institutions and policies which lay the foundations, through which principles of liberty and equality are designed and followed, thus directly or indirectly affecting firms or individuals who benefit from the directives and increase their growth, which in turn has a positive impact on economy.

The positive changes of democracy to economic growth such as delegation of authority and regulations of social conflicts heavily outweigh the negative and restrictive effects, especially when compared to autocracy. One of the main reasons for this is that society, i.e. voters are able to support difficult trade offs and changes when there is no perceived alternative. This is primarily true in countries with a higher level of education. So it ties the development level of a country as one of the decisive factors to undergo positive democratic changes and reforms. Thus, countries that embark in democratization at higher levels of education are more likely than not to continue their development under democracy.

As mentioned before, all of these factors do not guarantee success. As for each such case, there is a failure. There is never a single formula for democracy. The processes in associations with peace, social stability and rapid socioeconomic development are not yet fully understood, which may be the reason for a widespread opinion and many hypotheses.

A 2008 meta-analysis found that democracy has no direct effect on economic growth. However, it has strong and significant indirect effects which contribute to growth. Democracy is associated with higher human capital accumulation, lower inflation, lower political instability, and higher economic freedom. Democracy is closely tied with economic sources of growth, like education levels and lifespan through improvement of educative institutions as well as healthcare. "As democracy expands in developing countries, newly empowered workers are likely to demand better living conditions, health care, access to clean water, and so on—all conditions that contribute to increased life expectancy and, in turn, to increased productivity". There is also some evidence that it is associated with larger governments and more restrictions on international trade.

If leaving out East Asia, then during the last forty-five years poor democracies have grown their economies 50% more rapidly than nondemocracies. Poor democracies such as the Baltic countries, Botswana, Costa Rica, Ghana, and Senegal have grown more rapidly than nondemocracies such as Angola, Syria, Uzbekistan, and Zimbabwe.

Democratizing African countries can prefer the economically larger autocratic China over democratic Taiwan in search of economic advantages (aid, trade and FDI). This correlation is true in all 7 African who became new democracies after 2000 or were approaching an election following previous electoral performance combined with an economic recession.

=== Survival of autocracies ===
Some autocracies disappear in the midst of an economic crises, while other after a long period of prosperity, some after the founding dictator dies or some as a result of defeat in foreign wars. However, observing the conditions and predicting a transition to democracy is so difficult, because the conditions only lay the ground-works for the possibility that it may occur. But it is actions of people under these conditions that shape the outcome. Many dissertations have been written on the history of different transitions, and the opinions are divided into two main categories. One party proclaims that it boils down to the creation of civil society, which comes to fruition almost of itself. A process fostered by transformations of the social structure. However, others proclaim that it is those that start with play the "strategic game" and reach a bargain under conditions taken as a datum. The literature pits "sociological" against "strategic" perspectives, yet we can say that both of them are needed for a transition, and they are not mutually exclusive.

In other words, a country that undergoes democratization does not have to necessarily experience economic growth, most often measured in income per capita, or vice versa. For every such case there exists a counter example. What this means is that there are multiple factors, such as political stability and political institutions, social insurance, government capacity, religion and many other which influence the outcome. In two similar countries, almost identical democratic regimes can yield completely different results. However, the concepts highly complement each other, and in cases through history where they were separated there has been great difficulty.

Executive constraint by legislatures affects the size of economic downturns during leadership turnover.

=== Survival of democracies ===
The conditions for their origins may be hard to determine, but the factors on which its survival depends are easily identifiable, and are tightly connected to economic growth, that is the level of development measured as per capita income. Another factor would be the education of the labor force. Specifically the years of schooling of an average citizen. This greatly elevates the probability that a democracy will survive. However, even though income and education are highly correlated, their impact seems to be to some extent independent, with the impact of per capita income being much stronger. Empirical patterns show that a democracy is more fragile in countries where per capita income stagnates or declines, but the causality is not clear. The fact that economic growth is tightly connected to democracies does not come as a surprise, since democracies are more frequent among the economically developed countries, and are rarer among poor ones.

== Effects of economic development on democracy ==
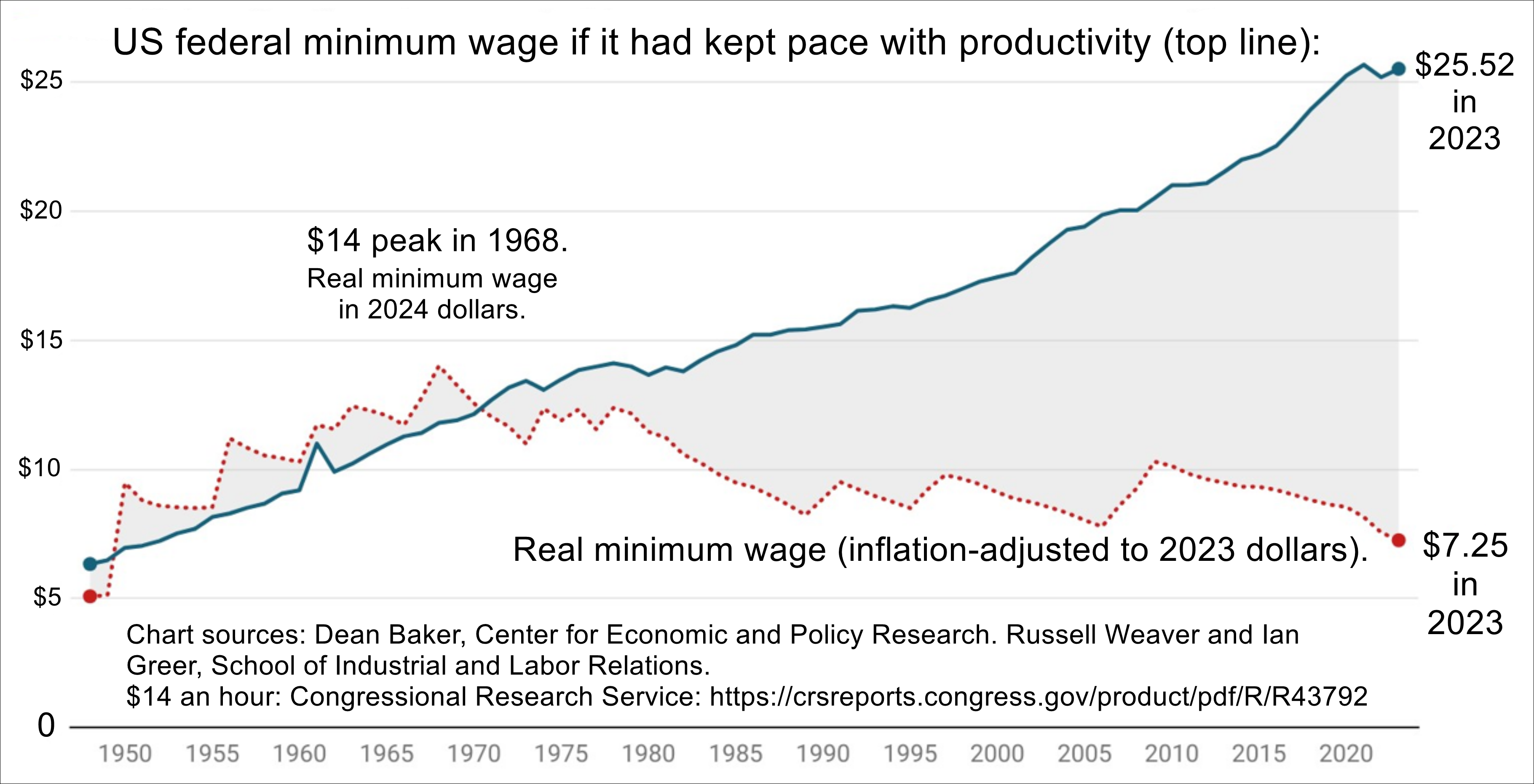
US federal minimum wage if it had kept pace with productivity. Also, the real minimum wage.

The notion of economic growth having a greater influence on democracy was a very popular opinion in the 1950s. The most important work on the subject has been done by Lipset 1959, where he states that economic development is one of the prerequisites for democracy. However, this is true. Both concepts are of equal importance and there are many cases where one acts as a prerequisite for the other, i.e. highly influencing the outcome.

Economic development may influence democracy in many ways. By tightening the revolution constraint, creating rising inequality or simply increasing the level of income in the society. And while the increase in GDP may be the primary method of measurement, there is much more, such as forming or greatly changing productive relationships, migrating firms and workers to cities up to affecting human capital and technology. This means that as an economic structure transforms, and since it is related to capital intensity, capital itself becomes more important than land, which is one of the reasons that states with a higher income per capita would generally perform better.

As mentioned, the causality of economic development and democracy is inconclusive. However, if we consider that democracy should be supported by some preconditions, it is economic growth that creates these conditions for democracy: industrialization, urbanization, widespread of education and literacy, wealth, and a strong middle class which are involved with the protection of their right and issues of public affairs. Work done by Lipset is best well known on this topic. By his comparative studies Lipset shows a strong statistical association between GNP per capita and the level of democracy, to finally conclude that "the more well-to-do a nation, the greater the chance that it will sustain democracy". It is especially relevant in just shaping democracies, even though they may survive in poorer conditions.

As democracies require certain political institutions, it is quite interesting that they do not have a high impact on economic growth. What matters for economic development is, in fact political stability, rather than a particular political institution. As it is safe to assume that any political institution will promote development as long as it is stable, which means that the danger lies in political instability. And as measured in the past by the frequency of strikes, demonstrations, riots, it is much greater in democracies, and a lot less likely in e.g. dictatorships. Yet, political instability does not affect economic growth in democracies, only in dictatorships. The reasons for this are not entirely clear, whether it may be due to institutional constraints or of motivations of those who govern democracies. Under dictatorships, it slows down significantly when the tenure of rulers is threatened. Similar outcomes emerge under various forms of "socio-political unrest" such as strikes, anti-government demonstrations and riots. Under different regimes, political phenomena have a different meaning, and as such, it is not surprising that economic actors react differently. Under dictatorships, whenever the regime is threatened, or there are expected changes, workers or masses of people assemble to strike and protest against their opposition, that is the government, and the economy suffers. Under democracies, this is rarer, since everyone knows that the government will change from time to time, and while they know that they are able to protest in the same manner, most often than not they do not. For instance, it would be enriching to see Gerald Scully for some strong arguments on political instability and growth. Studies actually observe that democracies can somewhat affect growth. Studies have also shown that the low economic growth may increase the probability of political instability. In fact democracies have a negative but weak impact on growth. but we can't miss addressing that major instability on involving dramatical political changes can be harmful for economic growth.

== Direction of effect ==
Empirical data tends to consistently suggest a causal relationship between democracy and economic development. The causal direction does appear to change, however. In some nations, economic growth has been observed to promote democracy, while in others the opposite is true. Research done in post-socialist nations has shown increases in political freedom to have little to no effect on economic growth, however changes in political freedom have been influenced by the aforementioned growth. Meanwhile, wider studies have found democracy to improve economic growth when investigating the effects of democratic variables such as increased government spending, increased private investment due to higher economic freedom, and even social unrest.

There are several once very impoverished countries that have experienced significant and rapid economic growth without democratic institutions, for example Chile, Hong Kong, Taiwan, Singapore and South Korea. To the extent that political democracy exists in these countries today, it has only recently emerged. What they have in common, being backward countries in the past, is that they all have relatively free markets. We could say that they are economically free, meaning they have little to no protectionism, i.e. tariff and quotas on imports, except for South Korea. This allows them to relieve the citizens of the burden in the form of taxation and economic regulation, and this is one of the reasons of their growth. Another characteristic common between them and vital is that they have secure property rights and the rule of law. A different case can be shown with India, where economic prosperity was jeopardized due to people forming interest groups and losing their political freedom. This compromises the free market institutions which are essential to economic growth. A similar case can be said about Africa north of the Sahara.

== See also ==
- Economic stability
- Economic liberalization
- Lee thesis
- Median income – Macroeconomic indicator
- Modernization theory – Explanation for the process of modernization within societies
