= Lee thesis =

Hypothesis in politics and economics

In political philosophy and development studies, the Lee thesis, also known as the full-belly thesis or development without freedom, is an economic hypothesis that holds that authoritarianism can result in greater economic growth.

Named after the first prime minister of Singapore, Lee Kuan Yew, the thesis holds that the recognition of civil and human rights by a government will sometimes impair economic growth, and that economic efficiency and more rapid economic development should, and often will, be facilitated by the denial of some political liberties. Weak forms of the Lee thesis argue for a prioritisation of economic development before freedom, which can be introduced at a certain level economic and social development. Strong forms hold that democracy and economic growth are incompatible, such that constitutional systems of authoritarian government have a direct economic advantage over democratic ones, ceteris paribus.

The Lee thesis assumes that if a person or society in poverty had to pick between a strong economy and political liberties, they have a better reason to choose the former over the latter, and a government should act in accordance with the overall social welfare function to prefer reducing poverty and improving material conditions. Lee's thesis also relates to his theory of Asian values, which held that liberal Western values of welfarism and equality are inapplicable in East Asian societies that prefer stability and progress. Similar arguments in favour of a pluralist conception of rights, which emphasise economic and property rights over social and political ones, have also been advocated in African countries.

As a theory of soft authoritarianism or benevolent dictatorship, the Lee thesis also holds that that economic growth under authoritarian capitalism is facilitated by specific constitutional and institutional mechanisms, such as efficient law enforcement; strong public institutions; restraint and deference in judicial review; legal exceptionalism, particularly in regard to national security issues; and the use of social engineering and policy to achieve consensus and maintain popularity.

Proponents point to the rapid economic development of Asian economies that adopted authoritarian policies at various points in their development, including Singapore, South Korea, Taiwan, and China, comparing these jurisdictions to less economically-developed democracies, such as India. Both statistically and methodologically, it is difficult to prove broader statements of the Lee hypothesis across countries. Empirical evidence establishing a link between democracy and growth is mixed, with Daron Acemoglu and Amartya Sen arguing against such a correlation, and Robert Barro and Samuel P Huntington providing arguments for some elements of the thesis.

== Empirical evidence ==
From an empirical perspective, a number of studies have attempted to examine the direct and indirect relationship between democracy and economic growth. A body of literature suggests that there is either no definitive systematic effect of democracy on economic growth or that it is impossible to recognize whether democracy has an impact on economic growth.

John F. Helliwell's 1994 study employed a two-equation system for a sample of 125 countries during the period 1960–1985, finding that, although the positive indirect effect appears to offset the negative direct effect, the net effect of democracy on economic growth seems impossible to discern. A 2001 study by Maria Tavares and Romain Wacziarg, for a sample of 65 industrialized and developing countries over the period 1970–1989, also finds indirect growth effects and direct negative effects. In a 2002 paper, covering a panel of 106 countries covering the period 1951–1980, Charles Kurzman finds no significant direct effect between democracy and growth. A 2003 study by Baum and Lake, with data for a sample of 128 countries over a 30-year period, concludes that there is no direct influence of democracy on economic growth.

Using an instrumental variables technique for a sample of 175 countries during the period 1960–2010, Daron Acemoglu et al finds a positive and significant effect of democracy on economic growth. He and co-authors argue that democracy promotes growth by encouraging economic reforms, stimulating investment in primary education and health and mitigating social unrest. Acemoglu's opposing thesis, that inclusive institutions lead to economic success and extractive ones lead to economic failure, and that democracy is good and autocracy is bad for our economic well-being, have been popularised in his 2012 book, Why Nations Fail.

=== Mechanisms ===
Political scientist Samuel P. Huntington was one of the first to argue that democracy leads to an increase in current consumption and a decrease in investment and production, thus penalising economic growth. Empirical evidence strongly suggests that democracies reduce income inequality through implementing redistribution policies, which could also be harmful for growth. Some studies have shown that democracies have direct or indirect negative growth effects, potentially by hindering physical capital accumulation as well as increasing public spending and consumption.

Democracies appear to be associated with higher school attainment rates, increased literacy rates, a better health care provision, higher life expectancy and lower infant mortality, and it is thus possible that democracies have a positive indirect impact via education and investment. A body of literature emphasises that democracy may also indirectly enhance growth via increased spending on public health, promoting human capital accumulation, and reducing income inequality.

== Ethics and culture ==
In his 1950 Nobel Prize lecture, Bertrand Russell asked, "If one man offers you democracy and another offers you a bag of grain, at what stage of starvation will you prefer the grain to the vote?" Correspondingly, a variant of the Lee thesis is also known, particularly in African developmental studies, as the full-belly thesis.

Empirically, it is methodologically difficult to test the claim that persons in authoritarian jurisdictions would have a preference toward economic growth and a relative indifference toward democracy and human rights. Amartya Sen has argued that it is possible that persons in developing countries would prefer to be freer and poorer rather than richer but less free.

=== Asian values ===
The Lee thesis, as part of Lee Kuan Yew's broader political philosophy, was closely related to his Asian values argument, which held that the value system of Asian countries, particularly East Asian countries, prioritised order, stability, and moral conduct over liberty, democracy, and human rights. Proponents of the argument regard democracies as conducive to social disorder, criminality, and the destruction of entire communities for the sake of individual rights. Lee's view, however, has been criticised as ahistorical and athoretical, misrepresenting and misconstruing Confucianism for politically expedient purposes.

Proposals for international human rights law to accommodate variations of the Lee thesis and Asian values have generally been rejected by international institutions. According to the Lee thesis, rights are subject to two trade offs: economy over liberty (i.e. citizens prefer economically efficient rights-ignoring government over inefficient, rights-affirming ones); and community over individual (i.e. citizens would prefer for an entire society to benefit at the expense of an individual, rather than an individual benefitting at the expense of society).

== Economics ==
=== Condorcet paradox ===
Suppose a society S with members denoted by $s_n$. Let $S_{-i}$ denote the set of all members except for $s_i$. The action set available to each member is $\{A,B\}$. For example, A is lighting a fire to keep warm, and B is not lighting the fire. When $s_i$ chooses A, negative externalities (e.g. smoke) are incurred for everyone else. Note, however, that when A is played, $u(s_i) > -u(S_{-i})$, that is, the benefit to the individual of having the fire exceeds the cost to the others of the smoke. Now, in a direct democracy, at each legislative session or election, the members in S can vote on whether to enact, maintain, or repeal a regulation that will restrict a given member, $s_i$, from performing A. Since $S_{-i}$ will always vote in favour of enacting or maintaining regulations against $s_i$, eventually, as the game is repeated, none of the players will be allowed to perform action A. At this point, however, S will unanimously vote to abolish all regulations, resulting in the game starting again, thus illustrating a Condorcet cycle.

== Policy design ==
Authoritarian countries that have experienced rapid economic growth include Singapore under Lee Kuan Yew; China under Deng Xiaoping; Taiwan under Chiang Kai-shek; Korea under Park Chung-Hee; Spain under Francisco Franco; and Chile under Augusto Pinochet. Elements of the Lee thesis have received broad support by other Southeast Asian governments and officials, including by former prime minister of Malaysia, Mahathir Mohamad; president of Indonesia, Joko Widodo; and China's Ministry of Foreign Affairs.

In African development studies, the Lee thesis, or "full-belly" thesis, represents one of two major schools, alongside Amartya Sen's development as freedom model. African proponents of the Lee thesis—most prominently, Rwanda's Paul Kagame—have argued for strong, active, pro-market leadership following the economic miracles seen in Asia during the second half of the twentieth century. As a form of benevolent dictatorship, the Lee thesis is thought of as an alternative to the corrupt, personalistic autocracies and ineffectual democracies experienced by many African states.

As a development state model, the Lee thesis is exemplified by China and Singapore, which have resisted political democratisation despite rapid economic development, unlike jurisdictions such as Japan and South Korea, which have experienced increasing democratisation with economic development. The success of the Singapore model in Rwanda has also resulted in the term "Africa's Singapore" being used to describe the nation, which has itself become a developmental model for other African nations.

=== Constitutional design ===
Arguing against the Lee thesis, Amartya Sen holds that the incorporation of democracy into a political system has a number of institutional and constitutional benefits that are enabled by multiparty electoral politics, political activism, and freedom of the press. Instrumentally, electoral democracy creates institutional incentives and disincentives for government and officials to perform more efficiently and in line with the demands of citizens, and such an incentive system relies upon a state that requires government to listen to citizens. Sen also argues that the construction and understanding of economic needs within a society may, in theory, only be possible if there is a degree of freedom of speech. Lee himself has denied any role of a free press in supporting economic development.

Proponents of the Lee thesis argue that it is possible to enjoy some or all of the benefits of apparent democracy within a soft authoritarian system, without implementing a liberal democratic constitution. For example, in order to increase foreign direct investment, a country may have an apparent procedural multiparty democracy, whilst being substantively controlled by a one-party state. Further, under the developmental state model, state intervention in economy and society is regarded as a key factor in contributing to economic growth.

Former ambassador of Singapore, Chan Heng Chee, has also argued that any realisation of democracy in Singapore will involve a different concept of democracy than the one conventionally accepted in the West. According to Chan, a Singaporean democracy will retain features of an authoritarian, socially illiberal and centralised one-party state. Similarly, Rwandan officials have described the aspiration for the country as ‘democracy with Rwandan characteristics’, a system that disavows competitive politics in favour of consensus politics that operates not only among political parties but also across the entire general population. Under such a system, all agents, both public and private, within the political community, aim for cooperation rather than competition, and it would not usually be necessary for the government to intervene to enforce its will, as agents will already prefer to act in a way that helps the government achieve its goals.

==== Rule of law ====
Under the Lee thesis, the rule of law is distinct from any of the values of liberal democracy. Rather, the rule of law is primarily associated with desiderata associated with the functioning of the legal system (e.g. the enforcement of business contracts and property rights) as well as the maintenance of law and order (e.g. obedience to the law and low levels of criminality).

Concerns over judicial overreach or supremacy should be mitigated by a strong degree of alignment between judicial decisions and the politics of the executive branch. Even under a benevolent dictatorship, courts can enjoy a degree of judicial independence and creativity in issues of private law, but they should generally defer to the executive in certain areas of public law, such as national security and social policy, as was the case in apartheid-era South Africa. In this manner, judicial power, even in judicial review, is exercised in a manner that is readily accepted by the government; for example, during Anwar Sadat's rule of Egypt, judicial independence was regarded as a tool by which corruption and abuses of administrative power (particularly at lower levels of government) could be controlled, and through which foreign investors retained confidence in the country's economic system.

==== Civil service and institutions ====
Following in the pattern of development of Singapore and other Asian countries in the post-WWII period, the post-genocide Rwandan regime has invested significantly in the building of strong state institutions staffed by technocratically competent individuals. The country's surveillance state has also allowed it a high level of social control, with the ability of the state to monitor and enforce its policies at all levels of society. Nonetheless, the Rwandan political order has also been described as a mere political settlement, with relatively weak formal institutions but a political economy that relies upon a set of elite power relations and an agreed distribution of rents. Still, to supporters of the Rwandan regime, this settlement has been seen as a necessary antecedent to a country’s economic development.

=== Public-private partnerships ===
The Rwandan system for the central management of economic rents has been ‘with a view to enhancing their own and others’ incomes in the long run rather than maximizing them in the short run’. As such, the ruling Rwandan Patriotic Front holds controlling interests in several private companies that operate in strategically important sectors of Rwanda’s economy, thus allowing the regime to enjoy important rents from the hospitality, dairy, transportation, and mining industries.

=== Human capital development ===
The underlying precepts of the Lee thesis, particularly that of Asian values, in taught in schools around Southeast Asia. In Singapore, for example, students are taught to ‘know and love Singapore’ and ‘believe in Singapore,’ with curricula designed to direct belief firmly towards the developmental achievements of the ruling party.

Singaporean education policy is further deployed in an instrumental, capitalist fashion, as part of the broader developmental statism of the country, prioritising the development of human capital over other factors, even after the premiership of Lee Kuan Yew. Singapore's education system is regarded as world-leading in successfully developing critical-thinking and knowledge skills among students for particular market-oriented purposes, whilst tailoring the cultivation of these skills to restrict open debate and engagement in non-state sanctioned topics. At the same time, the highly socially stratified and elitist education system has contributed, in part, to levels of social inequality significantly higher than in the developed economies of Northeast Asia, including Japan, Korea and Taiwan.

=== Racial and ethnic stability ===
In Singapore, social, housing, and immigration policy are designed to reduce racial tensions among an ethnically and linguistically diverse population. Early into Singapore's independence, the Singapore government moved to eliminate the teaching of diverse regional languages in schools, instead imposing Mandarin Chinese as a unifying official mother tongue for the ethnic Chinese community. Officials have further used housing policy and immigration quotas to maintain a rigid categorisation of the population into four bureaucratically convenient but rigid and strongly-bounded ethnic silos, resulting in a plural monoculturalism where ethnic communities co-exist in parallel, but inter-ethnic mingling is limited.

=== Constraints on expression, association, and assembly ===
==== National securitisation ====
The rhetoric of national security is used extensively in Singapore as a basis for state policy and its public acceptance. In school, students are taught that the nation has faced the dire threats in the past, and that unity and discipline are continuously needed to resist potential threats in the future. The government's attempt to legitimise controversial policies by invoking narratives of national security and the country’s innate vulnerability has been largely effective, with public acceptance or indifference for public policies on race, religion, freedom of expression, drugs, conscription, and the news.

The use of securitisation has also been emphasised in Rwanda, whose current regime, under Paul Kagame, has emphasised the role of the military and intelligence agencies within the state, employing coercive force to pursue developmental goals. For example, supporters of the Kagame regime argue that restrictions on freedom of expression are needed to protect the country from individuals pushing liberal ideals to their limits, given the risk of ethnic divisions engulfing the country once more in violence. To the extent that the limits of political freedoms appear to prohibit statements or actions that might jeopardise the position of the regime and the president, the need for national security and the risk of social upheaval legitimises such uses of coercion.

==== Declawing unions and lobbyists ====
In addition, under a democratic system, interest groups may exert pressure for higher wages, which would reduce the firms’ profitability, generating negative effects on investment. Labour union demands are usually accompanied by strikes and work stoppages, leading to huge economic losses. In this regard, authoritarian governments are better positioned to resist the influence of interest groups and lobbies and, therefore, more willing to implement effective economic policies.
