= Substantive law =

Law governing societal behavior

Substantive law is the set of laws that governs how members of a society are to behave. It is contrasted with procedural law, which is the set of procedures for making, administering, and enforcing substantive law. Substantive law defines rights and responsibilities in civil law, and crimes and punishments in criminal law, substantive equality or substantive due process. It may be codified in statutes or exist through precedent in common law.

Henry Sumner Maine said of early law, "So great is the ascendency of the Law of Actions in the infancy of Courts of Justice, that substantive law has at first the look of being gradually secreted in the interstices of procedure; and the early lawyer can only see the law through the envelope of its technical forms."

== History ==
=== Ancient history ===
==== Hammurabi's Code ====
Hammurabi's Code was an ancient Babylonian law code issued by King Hammurabi (1792-1750 B.C.) and was created around 1754 B.C. It is considered one of the oldest and most preserved written legal documents in history. It was a collection of 282 laws.

The code covered legal areas such as offences against the administration law, property offences, land and houses, commerce, family and property, assault, professional men (ex. surgeons and builders), agriculture, rates of hire, and slaves.

==== Roman Twelve Tables ====
The Roman Twelve Tables were the earliest written code of ancient Roman law, created in 451-450 B.C. and was posted publicly in the Roman Forum around 449 B.C.

=== England ===
A person could only sue if there was already a writ that fit the problem, if there wasn't any fitting form, then there weren't any case. Reforms in the 1850s and the Judicature Acts of 1873-75 got rid of that system.

=== France and Germany ===
France's Napoleonic Code—enacted on March 21, 1804—put the main rules of private law, like property, contracts and family matters into one book. The rules for how court cases are run (procedural law) were kept in a separate code.

Germany did the same in 1900 with its Bürgerliches Gesetzbuch.

=== United States ===
==== New York's Field Code ====
New York's Field Code was a landark 1848 legal reform drafted by lawyer David Dudley Field. It replaced complex common-law pleading rules with simplified, understandable languages focused on the actual facts of a dispute. It introduced contingency fees, lawyer controlled pretrial discovery and the right for parties to testify in their own cases.

==== Federal Rules of Civil Procedure ====
The Federal Rules of Civil Procedure (FRCP) govern all civil actions and proceedings in United States district courts. It was adopted by the Supreme Court on December 20, 1937.

==== Erie Railroad v. Tompkins ====
Erie Railroad v. Tompkins is a United States Supreme Court decision that created the Erie doctrine. Under this rule, a federal court hearinga case based on state law msut apply the state's substantive law while using federal procedural rules.

=== Substantive due process ===
The U.S. Constitution's Due Process Clauses are understood to guarantee fair procedure, but courts have also held that they limit what the government can regulate at all, regardless of the procedure.

== See also ==
- Procedural law
- Substantive rights

== Sources ==
- Glanville Williams. "Substantive and Adjectival Law". Learning the Law. Eleventh Edition. Stevens and Sons. London. 1982. Pages 19 to 23.
- John W Salmond. "Substantive Law and the Law of Procedure". The First Principles of Jurisprudence. Stevens & Haynes. Bell Yard, Temple Bar, London. 1893. Pages 215 to 218.
- Walter Denton Smith. A Manual of Elementary Law. West Publishing Co. St Paul, Minn. 1894. Pages 110 to 116. Part 2 (The Substantive Law). Pages 123 to 279.
- "Substantive and Adjective Law" (1881) 16 The Law Journal 441 (1 October 1881)
- J Newton Fiero, "The Relation of Procedure to the Substantive Law", Law Pamph. Vol 202. (1904) 2 Delta Chi Quarterly 5 (January 1904).
- Clark, "The Handmaid of Justice" (1938) 23 Washington University Law Quarterly 297. Reprint, 1965.
- Abraham Lawrence Sainer. The Substantive Law of New York. Substantive & Adjective Law Publishers. Eighteenth Edition. 1967.
- Whitely Stokes (ed). The Anglo-Indian Codes. Clarendon Press, Oxford. 1887. Volume 1 (Substantive Law).
