= Equality of autonomy =

Political philosophy concept of Amartya Sen

Equality of autonomy is a political philosophy concept of Amartya Sen that argues "that the ability and means to choose our life course should be spread as equally as possible across society"—i.e., an equal chance at autonomy or empowerment. Equality of autonomy strives to spread empowerment widely so that "given their circumstances", people have more "choice and control". The concept has a slightly different emphasis from related notions, such as the value of equality in the workplace ("equal opportunity") or equal material wealth ("equality of outcome").

According to Todd May, Sen's approach requires "active intervention of institutions like the state into people's lives" but with an aim towards "fostering of people's self-creation rather than their living conditions". Sen argued that "the ability to convert incomes into opportunities is affected by a multiplicity of individual and social differences that mean some people will need more than others to achieve the same range of capabilities".

== See also ==
- Capability approach
- Development as Freedom
- Egalitarianism
- Equality of opportunity
- Equality of outcome
- Inequity aversion
