= Equity of condition =

Equity of condition in tax law and governmental spending is the economic condition, often arbitrary, that political leaders believe a person should be in after governmental social engineering and redistribution of wealth. The award or redistribution of wealth to the recipients overrides, substantially, any natural right of the producers of the wealth to keep the fruits of their labor.

The award of wealth in a socialist economy may be extensive, with a proscribed level of benefits for food, housing, health, education, recreation, welfare, etcetera—and have little or no relation to the citizen's productivity (e.g., before-tax income). The result, however, is that economic productivity and the standard of living can be lessened in a socialist economy due to disincentive to production.

Equity of condition in a mixed economy, such as the United States, can be nebulous and ever-changing. Governmental subsidies and tax deductions may be extended for political reasons, and a political leader may never provide comprehensive economic rationale for his particular fiscal policy actions. The cost of the benefits is merely shifted to a discriminated portion of the tax base. Benefits may also be illusory to recipients, because further political manipulation of the tax code by political leaders can nullify the recipients’ original gains.

== See also ==
- Income tax
- Implied level of government service
- Primacy of the state
- Primacy of the citizen and taxpayer
- Real property use tax
- Taxation in the United States
