= Mark R. Thompson =

American political scientist

Mark R. Thompson (born June 8, 1960) is an academic whose comparative politics research focuses on Southeast Asia, with particular interest in the Philippines, Singapore, and Thailand. He is currently studying autocratization and opposition to it, presidentialism, and dynastic leadership. He is chair professor of politics in the Department of Public and International Affairs at the City University of Hong Kong, where he is also director of the Southeast Asia Research Centre (SEARC).

He was president of the Hong Kong Political Science Association from 2018 to 2020 and of the Asian Political and International Studies Association from 2013 to 2014. He was a research fellow at the Center for Southeast Asian Studies (CSEAS) at Kyoto University in the winter of 2024, as well as Lee Kong Chian Distinguished Fellow for Southeast Asian Studies at the National University of Singapore in 2008 and Stanford University in 2009. The co-editor of the Routledge/City University of Hong Kong Southeast Asia Series, he has received several major external grants worth over one million USD. As the author and editor of 11 books and over 200 articles and book chapters, his research has been featured in the popular media (e.g. Time Magazine, The Washington Post, CNBC, and Wired Magazine). He lends his expertise to government, public foundations, and non-government organizations in the areas of East Asian (Northeast and Southeast Asia) politics and development and has been a regular commentator on leading academic blogs as well as in the local and international press.

== Education ==
He completed his B.A. in religious studies from Brown University in 1982. He received an M.A. and Ph.D. (1991 with honors) in political science at Yale University where he was mentored by Juan J. Linz and James C. Scott. Earlier, he had received a Dorot Foundation fellowship to attend a summer programme at Hebrew University (1980) and a Rotary Foundation scholarship to enroll in the political science MA programme at the University of the Philippines, Diliman (1984–85). In 1983, he studied German at the Goethe-Institut, Boppard, and in 1988, he studied Tagalog (Filipino) with a Foreign Language and Area Studies Fellowship at the University of Hawaiʻi at Mānoa.

== Academic career ==
He previously held permanent positions as a lecturer at the University of Münster, the University of the Bundeswehr Munich, the TU Dresden, and the University of Glasgow, where he was promoted to senior lecturer, and was a full professor at the FAU Erlangen-Nürnberg where he also served as associate dean as well as director of the North America Studies Center. He has also held several visiting positions: as acting chair professor and a director of the Southeast Asia program at the University of Passau, Germany, and as a visiting scholar at the University of California Berkeley as well as a visiting professor at Keio University, Japan, the University for Peace, Costa Rica, De La Salle University, the Philippines, and Thammasat University, Thailand. He became Professor of Politics at the Department of Asian and International Studies at the City University of Hong Kong in 2010 and was head of that department from 2015 to 2022. In 2023, he was promoted to chair professor in the Department of Public and International Affairs.

== Academic work ==
Thompson started his career as a student of Philippine politics, where he undertook several fieldwork trips between 1986 and 1989 about the opposition to Marcos, Sr. for his PhD dissertation at Yale University, later published by Yale University Press and New Day Press as The Anti-Marcos Struggle (1995). Together with Prof. Julio C. Teehankee, he received a Hong Kong Research Grants Council General Research Fund (GRF) to study Rodrigo Duterte’s illiberal populism. In 2016, he edited and contributed to a special issue in the Journal of Current Southeast Asian Affairs on "The Early Duterte Presidency in the Philippines". In 2018, he co-edited, with Eric Vincent Batalla, the "Routledge Handbook of the Contemporary Philippines". In 2023, he published "The Philippines: From ‘People Power’ to Democratic Backsliding" in the Cambridge University Press “Elements” series. He recently received a General Research Fund grant with Professors Julio Teehankee and Ronald Holmes to study authoritarian nostalgia in the Philippines.

He also works on the politics of other Southeast Asia countries in comparative perspective. With Diego Fossati and Nicholas Thomas, in 2021 he was awarded an additional GRF grant on the political and public health consequences of COVID-19 in Southeast Asia. With Stephan Ortmann, he co-edited a special issue in China Quarterly, later revised and published as China’s “Singapore Model” and Authoritarian Learning (Rouitledge 2020). He earlier published a monograph Authoritarian Modernism in East Asia (Palgrave 2019). Together with Marco Bünte, he co-edited a special issue on presidentialism in Southeast Asia in Contemporary Politics in 2018 and published a co-edited volume on this same topic in 2023. In 2023 he co-edited a special issue in Asian Studies Review with Michael Connors entitled “Locating Liberalisms in Southeast Asia”.

In the 1990s and early 2000s, he published several articles on Eastern Europe, former East Germany in particular, as part of his comparative interest in “democratic revolutions,” with a book with this title published by Routledge in 2004. He completed a major German Research Foundation (DFG) project about dynastic female leaders in Asia, for which he co-edited a volume published in German (2004) and in English (2013) and has continued to write about Asian dynastic female national leadership.

== Selected bibliography ==
Some of his works include:

Books

- The Anti-Marcos Struggle. Personalistic Rule and Democratic Transition in the Philippines, New Haven: Yale University Press, 1995, ISBN 0-300-06243-5.
- Democratic Revolutions: Asia and Eastern Europe, London: Routledge, 2004, ISBN 978-0-415-40682-6.
- (co-edited with Claudia Derichs) Dynasties and Female Political Leaders in Asia: Gender, Power and Pedigree, Berlin/London: LIT Verlag, 2013. ISBN 9783643903204.
- (co-edited with Eric Vincent Batalla) The Routledge Handbook of the Contemporary Philippines (London: Routledge, 2018).
- (co-edited with Stephan Ortmann) China’s “Singapore Model” and Authoritarian Learning (London: Routledge, 2020)
- (co-edited with Marco Bünte) Presidentialism and Democracy in East and Southeast Asia (London: Routledge, 2023).
- The Philippines: From “People Power” to Democratic Backsliding (Cambridge University Press, 2023).

Special journal issues

- “Locating Liberalisms in Southeast Asia”, co-edited with Michael Connors, Asian Studies Review (published online between 4 August and 12 January 2023.
- “The ‘Singapore Model’ and China's New Neo-Authoritarian Dream,” co-edited with Stephan Ortmann, The China Quarterly (Vol. 236, 2018), pp. 930-1032.
- “Perilous Presidentialism in Southeast Asia?”, co-edited with Marco Buente, Contemporary Politics, 2018, 24, no. 3, pp. 251-360.

Articles

- "Introduction. The Early Duterte Presidency in the Philippines," pp. 3–14 and "Bloodied Democracy: Duterte and the Death of Liberal Reformism in the Philippines," pp. 39–68 both in the Journal of Current Southeast Asian Affairs, 35, no. 3 (2016) (open access, available online).
- “The Vote in the Philippines: Electing a Strongman,” Journal of Democracy, 27:4 (October 2016), pp. 124–134, with Julio Teekankee.
- “Populism and the Moral Economy of Electoralism in the Philippines and Thailand,” Journal of Developing Societies, 32: 3 (2016): pp. 246–269.
- “China’s ‘Singapore Model’ and its Limits,” Journal of Democracy, 27, no. 1 (January 2016), pp. 39-48, with Stephan Ortmann.
- “Democracy with Asian Characteristics,” Journal of Asian Studies, vol. 74, no. 4 (November 2015), pp. 875–887.
- “The Politics Philippine Presidents Make: Presidential Style, Patronage-based or Regime Relational?” Critical Asian Studies (September 2014), pp. 433–460.
- (with Stephan Ortmann), “China's Obsession with Singapore: Learning Authoritarian Modernity,” Pacific Review, 27, issue 3, (May 2014), pp. 433–55.
- “Populism and the Revival of Reform: Competing Narratives in the Philippines,” Contemporary Southeast Asia, 31, no. 1 (2010), pp. 1–28.
- “Japan’s German Path and Pacific Asia’s Flying Geese,” Asian Journal of Social Science, 38, no. 5 (2010), pp. 697–715.
- (with Philipp Kuntz) “More than the Final Straw: Stolen Elections as Revolutionary Triggers,” Comparative Politics, 41, no. 3 (April 2009), pp. 253–272.) (Munich: Allitera, 2007).
- “Asia’s Hybrid Dynasties,” Asian Affairs, XLIII, no. II, July 2012, pp. 204–220.
- “Das Ueberleben des Totalitaritarismus und Developmentalism in Ostasien” (The Survival of Totalitarianism and Developmentalism in East Asia), WeltTrends: Zeitschrift für Internationale Politik, Nr 82 (1/2012).
- “Reformism v. Populism in the Philippines,” Journal of Democracy 21, no. 4 (October 2010), pp. 154–168.
- “Japan’s German Path and Asia’s Flying Geese Formation,” Asian Journal of Social Science , 28, no. 5 (2010), pp. 697–715.
- with Philipp Kuntz, “More than the Final Straw: Stolen Elections as Revolutionary Triggers,” Comparative Politics, 41, no. 3 (April 2009), pp. 253–272.
- “People Power Sours: Uncivil Society in Thailand and the Philippines,” Current History 107, issue 712 (November 2008), pp. 381–387.
- “Presidentas and People Power in Comparative Asian Perspective,” Philippine Political Science Journal, 28, no. 51 (2007), pp. 1–32.
- with Ludmilla Lennartz, “The Making of Chancellor Merkel,” German Politics 15, no. 1 (2006), pp. 99–110.
- with Philipp Kuntz, "Stolen Elections: The Case of the Serbian October," Journal of Democracy, 15, No. 4 (October 2004), pp. 159–172.
- “Pacific Asia after ‘Asian Values’: Authoritarianism, Democracy, and ‘Good Governance’,” Third World Quarterly, 25, no. 6 (2004), pp. 1079-1095.
- “Les présidentes Philippines: essai de comparaison asiatique” Peninsule (special edition: “Les Structures Politiques Traditionnelles a Lépreuve de la Democratie en asie du sud-est’) 48, 1 (2004), pp. 65–84.
- “Female Leadership of Democratic Transitions in Asia,” Pacific Affairs, 75, no. 4 (Winter 2002-2003), pp. 535–555.
- “To Shoot or not to Shoot: Post-Totalitarianism in China and Eastern Europe,” Comparative Politics, Vol. 31, No. 1 (October 2001), pp. 63–83.
- “Whatever Happened to 'Asian Values'?” Journal of Democracy, 12, no. 4 (October 2001), pp. 154–165.
- “Late Industrialisers, Late Democratisers: Developmental States in the Asia-Pacific,” Third World Quarterly, Vol. 17, No. 4 (December 1996), pp. 625–647.
- "Why and How East Germans Rebelled,” Theory and Society, vol. 25, no. 2 (April 1996), pp. 263–299.
