= Development as Freedom =

Book by Amartya Sen

- Cover
- Author: Amartya Sen
- Language: English
- Subject: International development
- Publication date: 1999
- Media type: Print

Development as Freedom is a 1999 book about international development by Indian economist and philosopher Amartya Sen.

The American edition of the book was published by Alfred A. Knopf.

== Summary ==
Amartya Sen was the winner of the 1998 Nobel Prize in Economics. Development as Freedom was published one year later in 1999. In the book, Sen argues that development is a process of expanding people's freedoms, and entails five distinct "instrumental" freedoms:

1. political freedoms, for people to decide and critique who governs them,
2. economic facilities, including freedom to access credit,
3. social opportunities, which refer to access to education and healthcare,
4. transparency guarantees between people;
5. protective security for protection from abject poverty including through income supplements and unemployment relief.

Poverty is characterized by lack of at least one freedom (Sen uses the term unfreedom for lack of freedom), including a de facto lack of political rights and choice, vulnerability to coercive relations, and exclusion from economic choices and protections.

Based on these ethical considerations, Sen argues that development cannot be reduced to simply increasing basic incomes, nor to rising average per capita incomes. Rather, it requires a package of overlapping mechanisms that progressively enable the exercise of a growing range of freedoms. A central idea of the book is that freedom is both the end and a means to development.

Sen notes, for example, that African Americans do not live to as old ages as do people in regions of the world with comparatively smaller incomes. These regions include China, Costa Rica, and Kerala (an Indian state). While the African Americans would be seen as having lower poverty rates by traditional measurements of poverty (e.g., amount of income), a more multi-dimensional view of poverty - that includes poverty of reaching an old age - makes this less clear. This underscores Sen's idea that poverty and development should be seen as terms referring to someone's freedom. While higher incomes certainly allow someone to have more freedom to do what they want in life and to be living without serious material deprivation, Sen would argue that serious freedoms also include things like freedom to reach an old age. In achieving these freedoms, Sen says, measures should include things like employment opportunities, education, and access to health care.

A key observation in this book is that, "no famine has ever taken place in a functioning democracy."

Canadian social scientist Lars Osberg wrote about the book: "Although Development as Freedom covers immense territory, it is subtle and nuanced and its careful scholarship is manifest at every turn." Kenneth Arrow concluded "In this book, Amartya Sen develops elegantly, compactly, and yet broadly the concept that economic development is in its nature an increase in freedom."

== See also ==
- Equality of autonomy
- Human development theory
- Lee thesis
