= Procedural law =

Sum of the legal norms in court procedures

Procedural law, adjective law, in some jurisdictions referred to as remedial law, or rules of court, comprises the rules by which a court hears and determines what happens in civil, lawsuit, criminal or administrative proceedings. The rules are designed to ensure a fair and consistent application of due process (in the U.S.) or fundamental justice (in other common law countries) to all cases that come before a court.

Substantive law, which refers to the actual claim and defense whose validity is tested through the procedures of procedural law, is different from procedural law. In the context of procedural law, procedural rights may also refer not exhaustively to rights to information, access to justice, and right to counsel, rights to public participation, and right to confront accusers, as well as the basic presumption of innocence (meaning the prosecution regularly must meet the burden of proof, although different jurisdictions have various exceptions), with those rights encompassing general civil and political rights. In environmental law, these procedural rights have been reflected within the UNECE Convention on "Access to Information, Public Participation in Decision-making and Access to Justice in Environmental Matters" known as the Aarhus Convention (1998).

== Legal procedure ==
Although different legal processes aim to resolve many kinds of legal disputes, the legal procedures share some common features. All legal procedure, for example, is concerned with due process. Absent very special conditions, a court can not impose a penalty — civil or criminal — against an individual who has not received notice of a lawsuit being brought against them, or who has not received a fair opportunity to present evidence for themselves.

The standardization for the means by which cases are brought, parties are informed, evidence is presented, and facts are determined is intended to maximize the fairness of any proceeding. Nevertheless, strict procedural rules have certain drawbacks. For example, they impose specific time limitations upon the parties that may either hasten or (more frequently) slow down the pace of proceedings. Furthermore, a party who is unfamiliar with procedural rules may run afoul of guidelines that have nothing to do with the merits of the case, and yet the failure to follow these guidelines may severely damage the party's chances. Procedural systems are constantly torn between arguments that judges should have greater discretion in order to avoid the rigidity of the rules, and arguments that judges should have less discretion in order to avoid an outcome based more on the personal preferences of the judge than on the law or the facts.

Legal procedure, in a larger sense, is also designed to affect the best distribution of judicial resources. For example, in most courts of general jurisdiction in the United States, criminal cases are given priority over civil cases, because criminal defendants stand to lose their freedom, and should therefore be accorded the first opportunity to have their case heard.

== European history and concepts ==
=== Procedural law and substantive law in various languages ===
"Procedural law" in contrast to "substantive law" is a concept available in various legal systems and languages. Similar to the English expressions are the Spanish words derecho adjetivo and derecho material or derecho sustantivo, as well as the Portuguese terms for them, direito adjetivo and direito substantivo. Other ideas are behind the German expressions formelles Recht (or Verfahrensrecht) and materielles Recht as well as the French droit formel/droit matériel, the Italian diritto formale/diritto materiale and the Swedish formell rätt/materiell rätt; all of which, taken literally, mean "formal" and "material" law.

The same opposition can be found in the Russian legal vocabulary, with материальное право for substantive law and процессуальное право for procedural. Similar to Russian, in Bulgarian "материално право" means substantive law and процесуално право is used for procedural. In Chinese, "procedural law" and "substantive law" are represented by these characters: "程序法" and "实体法". In Germany, the expressions formelles Recht and materielles Recht were developed in the 19th century, because only during that time was the Roman actio split into procedural and substantive components.

=== Substance of procedural law/substantive law in Europe ===
In the European legal systems, the Roman law had been of great influence. In ancient times the Roman civil procedure applied to many countries. One of the main issues of the procedure has been the actio (similar to the English word "act"). In the procedure of the legis actiones the actio included both procedural and substantive elements. Because during this procedure the praetor had granted, or denied, litigation by granting or denying, respectively, an actio. By granting the actio the praetor in the end has created claims. I.e. a procedural act caused substantive claims to exist. Such priority (procedure over substance) is contrary to what we think of the relationship nowadays. But it has not only been an issue of priority and whether the one serves the other. Since the actio had been composed of elements of procedure and substance it was difficult to separate both parts again.

Even the scientific handling of law, which developed during medieval times in the new universities in Italy (in particular in Bologna, Mantua), did not come to a full and clear separation. The English system of "writs" in the Middle Ages had a similar problem to the Roman tradition with the actio. In Germany, the unity of procedure and substance in the actio definitely was brought to an end with the codification of the Bürgerliches Gesetzbuch (BGB) which came into force on 1 January 1900. The expression Anspruch (§ 194 of BGB) - meaning "claim" - has been "cleared" from procedural elements. And this was the time for "founding" the terms formelles / materielles Recht. However, after World War II the expression formelles Recht was found to be "contaminated" and to a broad extent has been replaced by Prozessrecht, narrowing the idea behind it to "law of litigation" (thereby excluding e.g. the law of other procedures and the law on competences).

== See also ==
- Civil procedure
- Criminal procedure
- Hearing (law)
- Legal technicality
- Vyavahara
